= Michael Chrastecky =

Slovenian-Italian ice dancer

Personal information
- Full name: Michael Chrástecký
- Born: 19 July 1999 (age 27) Karlovy Vary, Czech Republic
- Home town: Ljubljana, Slovenia
- Height: 1.87 m (6 ft 1 1/2 in)

Figure skating career
- Country: Italy
- Coach: Barbara Fusar-Poli; Roberto Pelizzola; Lukáš Csölley
- Skating club: Icelab Bergamo
- Began skating: 2006

Medal record
Italian Championships
Bronze medal – third place	2023 Brunico	Ice dance

Michael Chrastecky (born 19 July 1999) is a Czech-born Slovenian–Italian ice dancer. With his former skating partner, Carolina Portesi Peroni, he is the 2023 Italian national bronze medalist, a two-time Italian junior national champion (2020 & 2021) and competed in the final segment at the 2020 World Junior Championships. In September 2021, at the qualifications for the 2022 Winter Olympics, they placed as the third reserve. Chrastecky speaks seven languages, he is fluent in English, Czech, Italian, Slovene and French, and possesses a working proficiency of Bosnian and German.

He is living in the Zürich metropolitan area in Switzerland.

Competing for Slovenia with his former skating partner, Mina Švajger, he is the 2016 Slovenian junior national champion.

== Personal life ==
=== Early years in Sarajevo ===
Michael Chrastecky was born on 19 July 1999 in Karlovy Vary, Czech Republic to Czech parents.
In 2001 his family relocated to Sarajevo, Bosnia and Herzegovina. He began skating at the age of six in the Zetra Olympic Hall. His first coach in figure skating was Karlo Požgajčić. In 2005, he started to attend elementary school in Sarajevo.

=== Childhood in Ljubljana ===
In 2007 his parents relocated to Ljubljana, Slovenia. He was coached by Manja Robič-Zima, Silvo Švajger and Gordana Smrekar. During the summer months, he took part in summer camps with the coach Vladimir Dvojnikov in Trenčín, Slovakia and Ostrava, Czechia.
In 2015, he switched to ice dance teaming up with Mina Švajger.
He attended the Danila Kumar International School and the Bežigrad Grammar School.
In May 2017 he successfully completed the International Baccalaureate Diploma Programme.

=== Career in Milan ===
In 2016, Michael relocated to Milan, Italy to pursue his career in ice dancing teaming up with Carolina Portesi Peroni.
They were coached by Barbara Fusar Poli, Roberto Pelizzola, Lukáš Csölley and Corrado Giordani. Their training locations involved: the Mediolanum Forum in Assago Milan and Ice Lab Bergamo during the winther months, and Torre Pellice and Piazzatorre during the summer months.
In 2020 they became Italian junior national champions.
In 2021 they became junior national champions for the second time and also won the circuit of Gran Premio Italia 2020-21 (Italian Grand Prix of Figure Skating).

Michael Chrastecky became an Italian citizen in September 2021 via naturalization for sports merits, heading into the 2022 Winter Olympics qualifications.

In January 2023, Michael Chrastecky ended his partnership with Carolina Portesi Peroni.

== Career ==
=== Early career ===
Chrastecky initially competed as a singles skater representing Slovenia, winning the national novice title in 2013 and 2015. He later switched to ice dance and partnered with Mina Švajger. Švajger/Chrastecky debuted on the Junior Grand Prix in the 2015–16 season, placing twentieth at the 2015 JGP Austria and sixteenth at the 2015 JGP Croatia. The team split after one season.

Chrastecky next formed a partnership with Carolina Portesi Peroni representing Italy. Portesi Peroni/Chrastecky made their Junior Grand Prix debut at the 2017 JGP Italy, where they placed tenth. They did not return to the Junior Grand Prix the following season, competing instead at several minor, junior internationals and winning the bronze medal at the Italian junior national championships 2019.

=== 2019–20 season ===
Returning to the Junior Grand Prix, Portesi Peroni/Chrastecky placed seventh at 2019 JGP France and ninth at 2019 JGP Croatia. They won a bronze medal at the junior competition at Golden Spin and then took the gold medal at the Italian junior national championships 2020 for the first time. They concluded the season making their debut at the 2020 World Junior Championships, where they finished in seventeenth place.

=== 2020–21 season ===
With the coronavirus pandemic causing the cancellation of the international junior season, Portesi Peroni/Chrastecky won their second consecutive gold medal at the Italian junior national championships 2021.

=== 2021–22 season ===
Making their international senior debut on the Challenger series, Portesi Peroni/Chrastecky placed eleventh on the 2021 CS Lombardia Trophy. They next competed at the 2021 CS Nebelhorn Trophy, seeking to qualify a second spot for Italy at the 2022 Winter Olympics. They placed eighth, making Italy the third reserve.

=== 2022–23 season ===
They returned to compete after a six-month break from training, due to Carolina's knee surgery. They placed seventh at the 2022 CS Nepela Memorial, eighth at the CS Budapest Trophy, second at the 2022 Mezzaluna Cup, and second at the 2022 Pavel Roman Memorial.
At the 2023 Italian Figure Skating Championships they took the bronze medal making them substitutes for the 2023 European Figure Skating Championships.

In January 2023, Michael Chrastecky ended the partnership with Carolina Portesi Peroni.

== Programs ==
=== With Carolina Portesi Peroni ===
Season	Rhythm dance	Free dance
2022–2023	Samba: Hey Mama by David Guetta feat. Nicki Minaj, Bebe Rexha & Afrojack; Rhumba: Wicked Game by Ursine Vulpine feat. Annaca; Samba: Samba de Janeiro by Bellini choreo. by Barbara Fusar Poli, Lukas Csolley, Corrado Giordani	Lux Aeterna (from Requiem for a Dream); La terre vue du ciel by Armand Amar choreo. by Barbara Fusar Poli, Lukas Csolley, Corrado Giordani
2021–2022	Blues: Mercy on Me by Christina Aguilera; Funk: Dynamite by BTS choreo. by Barbara Fusar Poli, Lukas Csolley, Corrado Giordani	Lux Aeterna (from Requiem for a Dream); La terre vue du ciel by Armand Amar choreo. by Barbara Fusar Poli, Lukas Csolley, Corrado Giordani
2019–2020	Waltz: Ouverture; Quickstep: George Valentin; Slow fox: Pennies from Heaven; Swing: Peppy and George (from The Artist) by Ludovic Bource choreo. by Corrado Giordani	Io ci sarò by Andrea Bocelli choreo. by Corrado Giordani
2017–2018	Samba: Vocalizado; Cha cha: Sway by Pablo Beltrán Ruiz performed by Michael Bublé; Rhumba: Lunas Rotas by Rosana Arbelo; Samba: Batucada Brasileira choreo. by Corrado Giordani	Swan Lake by Pyotr Ilyich Tchaikovsky choreo. by Corrado Giordani

=== With Mina Švajger ===
Season	Short dance	Free dance
2015–2016	Waltz: A Dream Is a Wish Your Heart Makes performed by Lily James; Polka: La Polka de Minuit (from Cinderella) by Patrick Doyle choreo. by Manja Robič-Zima	Fiddler on the Roof; Sunrise, Sunset (from Fiddler on the Roof) by Jerry Bock, Sheldon Harnick choreo. by Manja Robič-Zima

== Competitive highlights ==
GP: Grand Prix; CS: Challenger Series; JGP: Junior Grand Prix

=== With Portesi Peroni for Italy ===
International
Event	16–17	17–18	18–19	19–20	20–21	21–22	22–23
CS Budapest							8th
CS Lombardia						11th	WD
CS Nebelhorn						8th	
CS Nepela Memorial							7th
Pavel Roman Memorial							2nd
International: Junior
Junior Worlds				17th			
JGP Croatia				9th			
JGP France				7th			
JGP Italy		10th					
Bosphorus Cup			2nd				
Egna Trophy			5th				
Golden Spin			5th	3rd			
Halloween Cup			WD	4th			
Volvo Open Cup			17th				
National
Italian Champ.	2nd J		3rd J	1st J	1st J		3rd

=== With Švajger for Slovenia ===
International: Junior
Event	2015–16
JGP Austria	20th
JGP Croatia	16th
Santa Claus Cup	13th
National
Slovenian Champ.	1st J

== Detailed results ==
ISU Personal best highlighted in bold.

With Portesi Peroni

=== Senior-level results ===
2021–22 season
Date	Event	RD	FD	Total
22–25 September 2021	2021 CS Nebelhorn Trophy	10; **62.69**	7; **95.05**	8; **157.74**
9–12 September 2021	2021 CS Lombardia Trophy	12; 60.94	10; 92.13	11; 153.07

=== Junior-level results ===
2020–21 season
Date	Event	RD	FD	Total
12–13 December 2020	2021 Italian Junior Championships	1; 61.42	1; 90.94	1; 152.36
2019–20 season
Date	Event	RD	FD	Total
2–8 March 2020	2020 World Junior Championships	16; 54.42	18; 78.63	17; 133.05
12–15 December 2019	2020 Italian Junior Championships	2; 55.65	1; 90.85	1; 146.50
4–7 December 2019	2019 Golden Spin of Zagreb	3; 61.79	4; 89.88	3; 151.67
17–20 October 2019	2019 Halloween Cup	4; 53.70	8; 77.62	4; 131.32
25–28 September 2019	2019 JGP Croatia	10; 52.87	7; 85.77	9; 138.64
21–24 August 2019	2019 JGP France	8; 53.60	7; 85.21	7; 138.81
2018–19 season
Date	Event	RD	FD	Total
1–3 February 2019	2019 Egna Dance Trophy	5; 52.96	6; 78.11	5; 131.07
13–16 December 2018	2019 Italian Junior Championships	3; 53.52	3; 76.95	3; 130.47
5–8 December 2018	2018 Golden Spin of Zagreb	5; 48.53	5; 73.04	5; 121.57
27 Nov – 1 December 2018	2018 Bosphorus Cup	2; 56.03	2; 77.27	2; 133.30
2017–18 season
Date	Event	SD	FD	Total
11–14 October 2017	2017 JGP Italy	11; 45.20	11; 61.87	10; 107.07
