= 2022 CS Nepela Memorial =

Figure skating competition

- Type: ISU Challenger Series
- Date: September 29 – October 1
- Season: 2022–23
- Location: Bratislava, Slovakia
- Host: Slovak Figure Skating Association
- Venue: Ondrej Nepela Arena

Champions
- Men's singles: (Italy) Gabriele Frangipani
- Women's singles: (United States) Isabeau Levito
- Ice dance: (Canada) Marjorie Lajoie / Zachary Lagha
- Previous: 2019 CS Nepela Memorial
- Next: 2023 CS Nepela Memorial
- Previous CS: 2022 CS Nebelhorn Trophy
- Next CS: 2022 CS Finlandia Trophy

The 2022 CS Nepela Memorial was held from September 29 to October 1, 2022, in Bratislava, Slovakia. It was the fourth event of the 2022–23 ISU Challenger Series. Medals were awarded in men's singles, women's singles, and ice dance.

== Entries ==
The International Skating Union published the list of entries on September 6, 2022.

Country	Men	Women	Ice dance
Austria		Stefanie Pesendorfer	
Bulgaria	Larry Loupolover		
Canada			Marjorie Lajoie / Zachary Lagha
Czech Republic		Eliška Březinová; Michaela Vraštáková	
Estonia	Aleksandr Selevko		
Finland			Yuka Orihara / Juho Pirinen
France	Landry Le May	Maïa Mazzara; Maé-Bérénice Méité	Marie Dupayge / Thomas Nabais
Great Britain	Edward Appleby; Graham Newberry	Nina Povey; Kristen Spours	
Hungary	Aleksandr Vlasenko	Regina Schermann	Mariia Ignateva / Danijil Szemko
Italy	Gabriele Frangipani	Lara Naki Gutmann	Victoria Manni / Carlo Röthlisberger; Carolina Portesi Peroni / Michael Chrastecky
Latvia	Deniss Vasiļjevs		
Lithuania		Aleksandra Golovkina	
Poland	Vladimir Samoilov		Anastasia Polibina / Pavel Golovishnikov
Serbia		Antonina Dubinina	
Slovakia	Adam Hagara	Ema Doboszová	Maria Sofia Pucherová / Nikita Lysak
South Korea	Cha Jun-hwan; Kim Han-gil; Kim Hyun-gyeom	Lee Hae-in	
United States		Alena Budko; Isabeau Levito	Oona Brown / Gage Brown; Eva Pate / Logan Bye

=== Changes to preliminary assignments ===
Date	Discipline	Withdrew	Added	Ref.
September 8	Men	(Hungary) Aleksei Vlasenko	—	
September 8	Men	(United States) Eric Sjoberg	—	
September 8	Ice dance	(Australia) India Nette / Eron Westwood	—	
September 8	Ice dance	(Hungary) Lucy Hancock / Ilias Fourati	—	
September 12	Women	(Hungary) Júlia Láng	—	
September 27	Men	(Canada) Corey Circelli	—	
September 27	Men	(Hungary) Mózes József Berei	—	
September 27	Men	(Sweden) Nikolaj Majorov	—	
September 27	Women	(Romania) Julia Sauter	—	
September 27	Ice dance	(Canada) Miku Makita / Tyler Gunara	—	
September 27	Ice dance	(Finland) Juulia Turkkila / Matthias Versluis	—	
September 27	Ice dance	(United Kingdom) Lilah Fear / Lewis Gibson	—	
September 29	Women	(Slovakia) Alexandra Michaela Filcová	—	

== Results ==
=== Men's singles ===
Rank	Skater	Nation	Total points	SP		FS	
1st place, gold medalist(s)	Gabriele Frangipani	Italy	244.57	1	87.39	1	157.18
2nd place, silver medalist(s)	Cha Jun-hwan	South Korea	226.32	2	80.81	2	145.51
3rd place, bronze medalist(s)	Deniss Vasiļjevs	Latvia	214.19	4	69.66	3	144.53
4	Kim Hyun-gyeom	South Korea	202.19	7	67.21	4	134.98
5	Kim Han-gil	South Korea	200.23	3	70.42	5	129.81
6	Vladimir Samoilov	Poland	194.04	6	67.31	6	126.73
7	Aleksandr Selevko	Estonia	187.47	9	63.84	7	123.63
8	Adam Hagara	Slovakia	182.95	10	60.30	8	122.65
9	Edward Appleby	Great Britain	182.64	5	67.85	11	114.79
10	Aleksandr Vlasenko	Hungary	177.16	8	65.20	12	111.96
11	Graham Newberry	Great Britain	174.56	12	54.26	9	120.30
12	Landry Le May	France	174.02	11	56.37	10	117.65
13	Larry Loupolover	Bulgaria	113.09	13	34.14	13	78.95

=== Women's singles ===
Rank	Skater	Nation	Total points	SP		FS	
1st place, gold medalist(s)	Isabeau Levito	United States	198.99	1	65.37	1	133.62
2nd place, silver medalist(s)	Lara Naki Gutmann	Italy	166.24	4	52.65	2	113.59
3rd place, bronze medalist(s)	Lee Hae-in	South Korea	164.88	2	58.06	3	106.82
4	Aleksandra Golovkina	Lithuania	157.37	3	53.96	5	103.41
5	Nina Povey	Great Britain	156.92	5	52.52	4	104.40
6	Alena Budko	United States	144.20	10	42.07	6	102.13
7	Maïa Mazzara	France	135.04	7	45.10	9	89.94
8	Stefanie Pesendorfer	Austria	133.75	6	49.28	10	84.47
9	Ema Doboszová	Slovakia	132.74	13	39.79	7	92.95
10	Regina Schermann	Hungary	132.29	9	42.28	8	90.01
11	Maé-Bérénice Méité	France	120.77	12	41.00	11	79.77
12	Kristen Spours	Great Britain	118.61	11	41.01	12	77.60
13	Michaela Vraštáková	Czech Republic	115.30	8	45.06	14	70.24
14	Antonina Dubinina	Serbia	106.56	14	34.49	13	72.07
WD	Eliška Březinová	Czech Republic	withdrew	15	34.25	withdrew from competition	

=== Ice dance ===
Rank	Team	Nation	Total points	RD		FD	
1st place, gold medalist(s)	Marjorie Lajoie / Zachary Lagha	Canada	193.35	1	75.79	1	117.56
2nd place, silver medalist(s)	Eva Pate / Logan Bye	United States	178.69	2	72.31	2	106.38
3rd place, bronze medalist(s)	Marie Dupayage / Thomas Nabais	France	165.78	3	63.07	4	102.71
4	Yuka Orihara / Juho Pirinen	Finland	165.32	4	62.34	3	102.98
5	Oona Brown / Gage Brown	United States	160.62	6	59.48	5	101.14
6	Victoria Manni / Carlo Röthlisberger	Italy	155.79	5	60.32	6	95.47
7	Carolina Portesi Peroni / Michael Chrastecky	Italy	148.55	8	57.84	7	90.71
8	Mariia Ignateva / Danijil Szemko	Hungary	147.39	9	56.87	8	90.52
9	Maria Sofia Pucherová / Nikita Lysak	Slovakia	144.78	7	58.69	9	86.09
10	Anastasia Polibina / Pavel Golovishnikov	Poland	128.75	10	52.31	10	76.44
