= Mezzaluna Cup =

Annual ice dance competition

- Status: Active
- Genre: Ice dance competition
- Frequency: Annual
- Venue: Palaghiaccio Mezzaluna
- Location: Mentana
- Country: Italy
- Organizer: Italian Ice Sports Federation

The Mezzaluna Cup is an annual ice dance competition sanctioned by the International Skating Union (ISU), organized and hosted by the Italian Ice Sports Federation (Italian: Federazione Italiana Sport del Ghiaccio) at the Palaghiaccio Mezzaluna in Mentana, in the Metropolitan City of Rome Capital in Italy. Medals may be awarded at the senior, junior, and novice levels, although competition at every level may not be held every year due to a lack of entrants.

The Mezzaluna Cup is held in honor of Simonetta Spalluto, an Italian ice dance referee and judge, who helped organize the 2006 Winter Olympics in Turin, as well as Walter Zuccaro, an Italian ice dance judge and member of the ISU Dance Technical Commission.

== Senior medalists ==
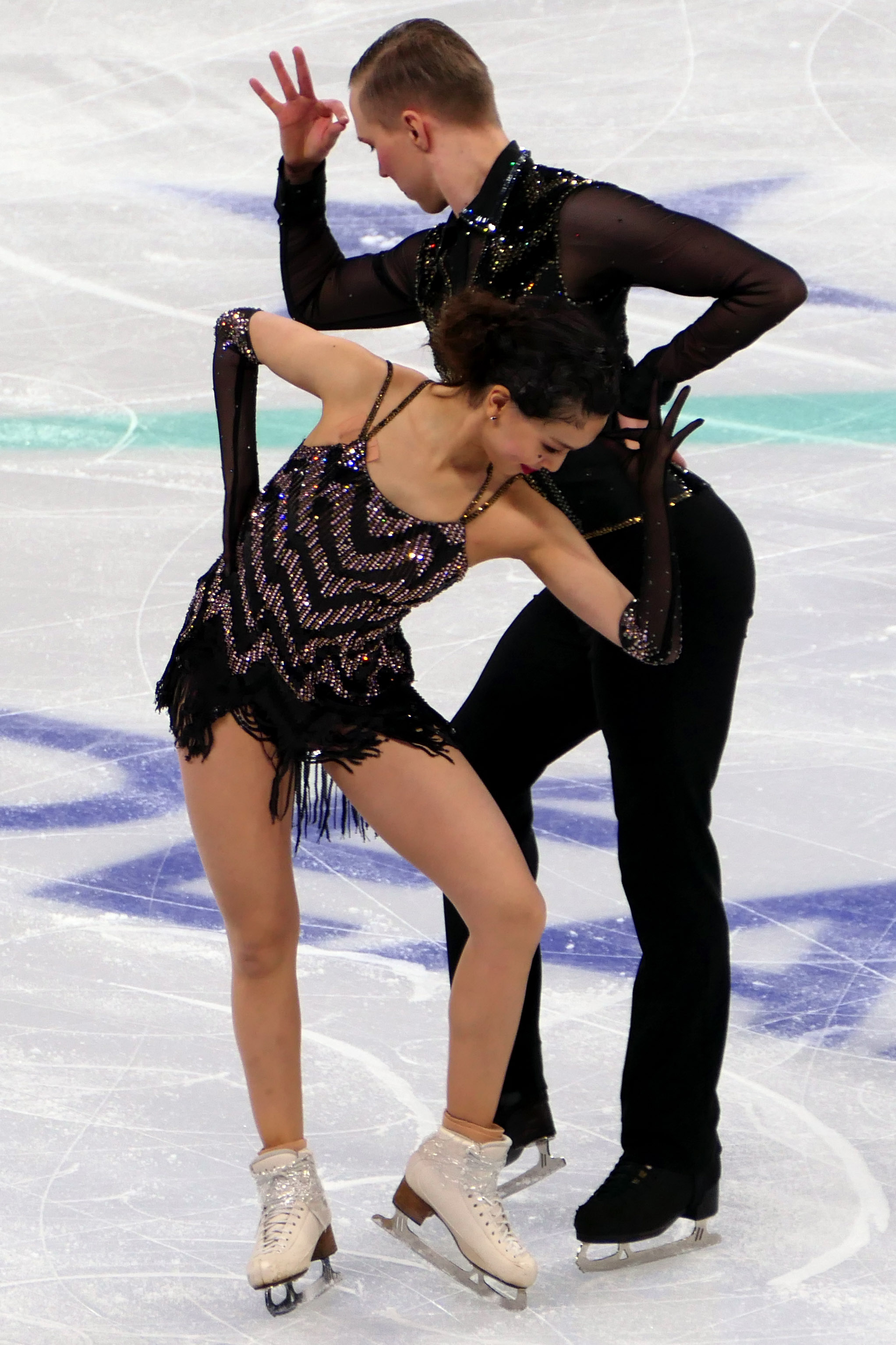
Yuka Orihara and Juho Pirinen of Finland, the 2025 Mezzaluna Cup gold medalists

Senior event medalists
Year	Gold	Silver	Bronze	Ref.
2019	(Ukraine); Oleksandra Nazarova; Maksym Nikitin	(France); Adelina Galyavieva; Louis Thauron	(Italy); Jasmine Tessari; Francesco Fioretti	
2020	No competition held			
2021	(Georgia (country)); Maria Kazakova; Georgy Reviya	(Australia); Chantelle Kerry; Andrew Dodds	(Italy); Carolina Moscheni; Francesco Fioretti	
2022	(Italy); Victoria Manni; Carlo Röthlisberger	(Italy); Carolina Portesi Peroni; Michael Chrastecky	(Czech Republic); Denisa Cimlová; Joti Polizoakis	
2023	(Finland); Yuka Orihara; Juho Pirinen	(France); Marie Dupayage; Thomas Nabais	(France); Natacha Lagouge; Arnaud Caffa	
2024	(Hungary); Mariia Ignateva; Danijil Szemko	(Italy); Giulia Isabella Paolino; Andrea Tuba	(Germany); Charise Matthaei; Max Liebers	
2025	(Finland); Yuka Orihara; Juho Pirinen	(Italy); Giulia Isabella Paolino; Andrea Tuba	(United States); Amy Cui; Jonathan Rogers	
2026	(Finland); Juulia Turkkila; Matthias Versluis	(Italy); Giulia Isabella Paolino; Andrea Tuba	(Italy); Carolina Portesi Peroni; Pietro Papetti	

== Junior medalists ==
Junior event medalists
Year	Gold	Silver	Bronze	Ref.
2019	(United Kingdom); Sasha Fear; George Waddell	(Russia); Vasilisa Kaganovskaya; Valeriy Angelopol	(Italy); Giulia Tuba; Andrea Tuba	
2020	No competition held			
2021	(Italy); Nicole Calderari; Marco Cilli	(Italy); Noemi Tali; Stefano Frasca	(Czech Republic); Denisa Cimlová; Vilem Hlavsa	
2022	(Slovakia); Anna Simova; Kirill Aksenov	(Italy); Noemi Tali; Stefano Frasca	(Germany); Karla Maria Karl; Kai Hoferichter	
2023	(France); Célina Fradji; Jean-Hans Fourneaux	(Italy); Giulia Isabella Paolino; Andrea Tuba	(Italy); Noemi Tali; Noah Lafornara	
2024	(Italy); Noemi Tali; Noah Lafornara	(Italy); Laura Finelli; Massimiliano Bucciarelli	(Slovakia); Aneta Vaclavikova; Ivan Morozov	
2025	(United States); Hana Maria Aboian; Daniil Veselukhin	(Italy); Zoe Bianchi; Daniel Basile	(Italy); Arianna Soldati; Nicholas Tagliabue	
2026	(Italy); Arianna Soldati; Nicholas Tagliabue	(Italy); Zoe Bianchi; Daniel Basile	(Italy); Laura Finelli; Tommaso Barison	
