= Ivett Tóth =

Hungarian figure skater (born 1998)

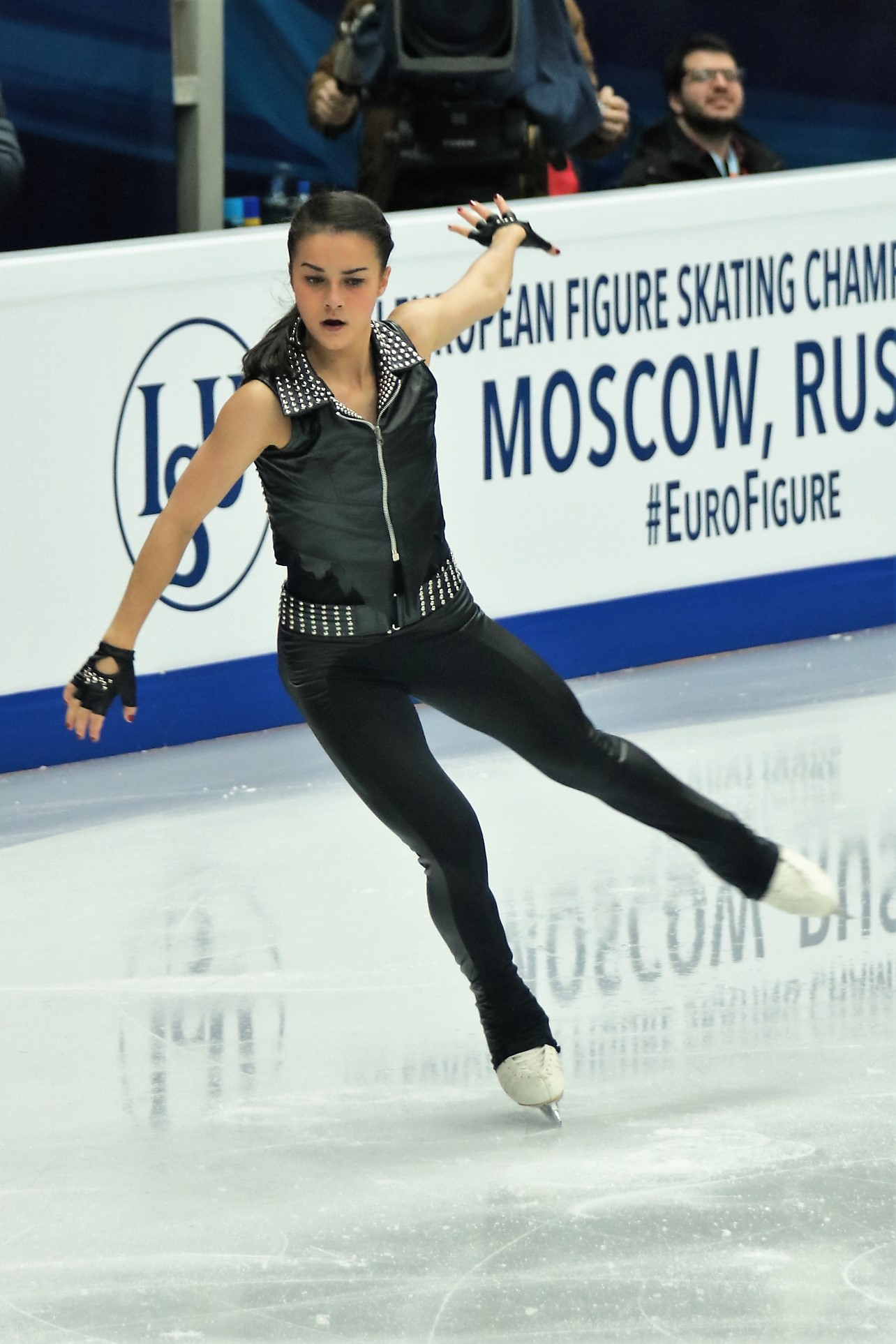
- Tóth in 2018

Personal information
- Born: 20 December 1998 (age 27) Budapest, Hungary
- Height: 1.59 m (5 ft 3 in)

Figure skating career
- Country: Hungary
- Coach: Zsófia Tokaji-Kulcsár, Zoltán Tóth
- Skating club: Vasas Budapest
- Began skating: 2004
- Retired: 2021

Ivett Tóth (born 20 December 1998) is a Hungarian retired figure skater. She is the 2014 CS Ice Challenge bronze medalist, a two-time Santa Claus Cup champion (2014, 2016), the 2018 Christmas Cup champion, the 2019 Volvo Open Cup champion, and a five-time Hungarian national (2014–2017, 2019). She has competed in the final segment at eight ISU Championships and placed 23rd at the 2018 Winter Olympics.

== Personal life ==
Ivett Tóth was born on 20 December 1998 in Budapest, Hungary. She attended Babits Mihály Gimnázium in Újpest.

== Career ==
=== Early years ===
Ivett Tóth's father first brought her to an ice rink in 2004. In 2009, she fractured her ankle and underwent surgery. She competed internationally on the advanced novice level for two seasons beginning in 2010–2011.

=== 2012–2013 season ===
Tóth debuted on the ISU Junior Grand Prix (JGP) series and won the Hungarian national junior title. Selected to represent Hungary at the 2013 World Junior Championships, she qualified for the free skate and finished 21st overall in Milan, Italy.

=== 2013–2014 season ===
Tóth remained a junior in international events but competed on the senior level nationally. She became the Hungarian national champion at the 2014 Four Nationals. At the 2014 World Junior Championships in Sofia, Bulgaria, she was eliminated after placing 31st in the short program. Tóth was coached by István Simon until the end of the 2013–14 season. Júlia Gór-Sebestyén became her coach in April 2014.

=== 2014–2015 season ===
In November, making her senior international debut, Tóth won the bronze medal at an ISU Challenger Series (CS) competition, the 2014 Ice Challenge in Graz, Austria. Her short program placements at the 2015 European Championships in Stockholm, Sweden (33rd); 2015 World Junior Championships in Tallinn, Estonia (28th); and 2015 World Championships in Shanghai, China (26th) were insufficient to advance to the free skate.

=== 2015–2016 season ===
Competing in the 2015 JGP series, Tóth finished 8th in Linz, Austria, and 6th in Zagreb, Croatia. After placing 5th at her CS event, the 2015 Ice Challenge, she took silver at the Santa Claus Cup and won her third consecutive senior national title.

At the 2016 European Championships in Bratislava, she qualified to the final segment by placing 10th in the short program with a personal best score. She then placed 12th in the free skate and 11th overall. She finished 8th at the 2016 World Junior Championships in Debrecen, Hungary, after placing 15th in the short and 7th in the free. At the 2016 World Championships in Boston, she was eliminated after placing 28th in the short program.

=== 2016–2017 season ===
Tóth finished 8th at the 2017 European Championships in Ostrava, Czech Republic. Ranked 14th in the short, she qualified to the final segment at the 2017 World Championships in Helsinki, Finland, and would finish 20th overall. Due to her result, Hungary qualified a spot in the ladies' singles event at the 2018 Winter Olympics in Pyeongchang, South Korea.

In May 2017, Júlia Gór-Sebestyén said that the two would no longer work together and Tóth decided to train under Linda van Troyen in Zurich, Switzerland.

=== 2017–2018 season ===
Tóth fractured her foot off ice in August 2017. As a result, she withdrew from the 2017 Rostelecom Cup, which would have been her Grand Prix debut. In December, she placed second to Fruzsina Medgyesi at the Hungarian Championships. In January, they both competed at the 2018 European Championships in Moscow, Russia; Tóth was the only one to qualify to the free skate and went on to finish 13th overall. She was selected as Hungary's Olympic entry on 19 January 2018.

In February, Tóth competed at the 2018 Winter Olympics in PyeongChang, South Korea. Her performance drew media attention when she appeared on ice to perform to AC/DC's Back in Black and Thunderstruck in a studded leather vest with a picture of Angus Young on the back. She qualified to the free skate and finished 23rd, both at the Olympics and at the 2018 World Championships, which took place the following month in Milan, Italy.

=== 2018–2019 season ===
Tóth decided to train with Zsófia Tokaji-Kulcsár and Zoltán Tóth in Budapest.

=== 2019–2020 season ===
Tóth competed at a number of minor international events in the first part of the season, including two Challenger events, placing eighth at the 2019 CS Ondrej Nepela Memorial and thirteenth at the 2019 CS Warsaw Cup. She was twenty-first among the competitors at the 2020 European Championships.

She had been assigned to compete at the World Championships in Montreal, but those were cancelled as a result of the coronavirus pandemic.

=== 2020–2021 season ===
Tóth finished sixth at the 2020 CS Budapest Trophy, and later won the bronze medal at the Santa Claus Cup.

=== 2021–2022 season ===
Tóth began the season at the 2021 CS Lombardia Trophy, where she finished twenty-seventh. On November 16, she announced her retirement from competitive figure skating.

== Programs ==
Season	Short program	Free skating	Exhibition
2019–2021	Earth Song; Smooth Criminal by Michael Jackson choreo. by Benoit Richaud	Torn (Redux) by Nathan Lanier; Resolve by Nathan Lanier choreo. by Benoit Richaud	
2018–2019	Grenade; Uptown Funk by Bruno Mars choreo. by Benoit Richaud	Torn (Redux) by Nathan Lanier; Resolve by Nathan Lanier choreo. by Benoit Richaud	
2017–2018	Thunderstruck by Malcolm Young; Back in Black by Angus Young, Malcolm Young, Brian Johnson choreo. by Benoit Richaud	Carmen by Georges Bizet	
2016–2017	Earth Song; Smooth Criminal by Michael Jackson choreo. by Benoit Richaud	Eleanor Rigby by The Beatles performed by Joshua Bell choreo. by Benoit Richaud	
2015–2016	Legend of Two Old Guys With a Mustache by Iiro Rantala; I Say a Little Prayer performed by Aretha Franklin choreo. by Júlia Gór-Sebestyén	Beyond by William Joseph; Esperanza by Maxime Rodriguez; Spanish Tango (from The Mask of Zorro) by James Horner choreo. by Júlia Gór-Sebestyén	Love Never Felt So Good by Michael Jackson, Justin Timberlake
2014–2015	Csárdás	La leyenda del beso by Raúl Di Blasio	
2013–2014	Mohabbatein by Jatin–Lalit	La leyenda del beso by Raúl Di Blasio	
2012–2013	Mohabbatein by Jatin–Lalit	Barcelona by John Tesh	

== Competitive highlights ==
GP: Grand Prix; CS: Challenger Series; JGP: Junior Grand Prix

International
Event	12–13	13–14	14–15	15–16	16–17	17–18	18–19	19–20	20–21	21–22
Olympics						23rd				
Worlds			26th	28th	20th	23rd	25th	C		
Europeans			33rd	11th	8th	13th	13th	21st		
GP Rostelecom						WD				
CS Budapest									6th	
CS Finlandia							13th			
CS Ice Challenge			3rd	5th						
CS Lombardia							7th			27th
CS Ondrej Nepela					10th			8th		
CS Tallinn Trophy					6th					
CS Warsaw Cup								13th	WD	
Challenge Cup								10th		
Christmas Cup							1st			
Cup of Tyrol							WD			
Coupe Printemps					3rd					
Golden Bear								12th		
Halloween Cup							3rd	4th		
Hellmut Seibt				2nd						
Santa Claus Cup			1st	2nd	1st				3rd	
Volvo Open Cup					2nd		1st	7th		
International: Junior
Junior Worlds	21st	31st	28th	8th						
JGP Austria				8th						
JGP Belarus		15th								
JGP Croatia			8th	6th						
JGP Czech Rep.			11th							
JGP Estonia		13th								
JGP Slovenia	14th									
Golden Bear	1st									
Santa Claus Cup	2nd									
Skate Celje		3rd								
National
Hungary	1st J	1st	1st	1st	1st	2nd	1st	1st		
