= Yuka Orihara =

Japanese-Finnish ice dancer (born 2000)

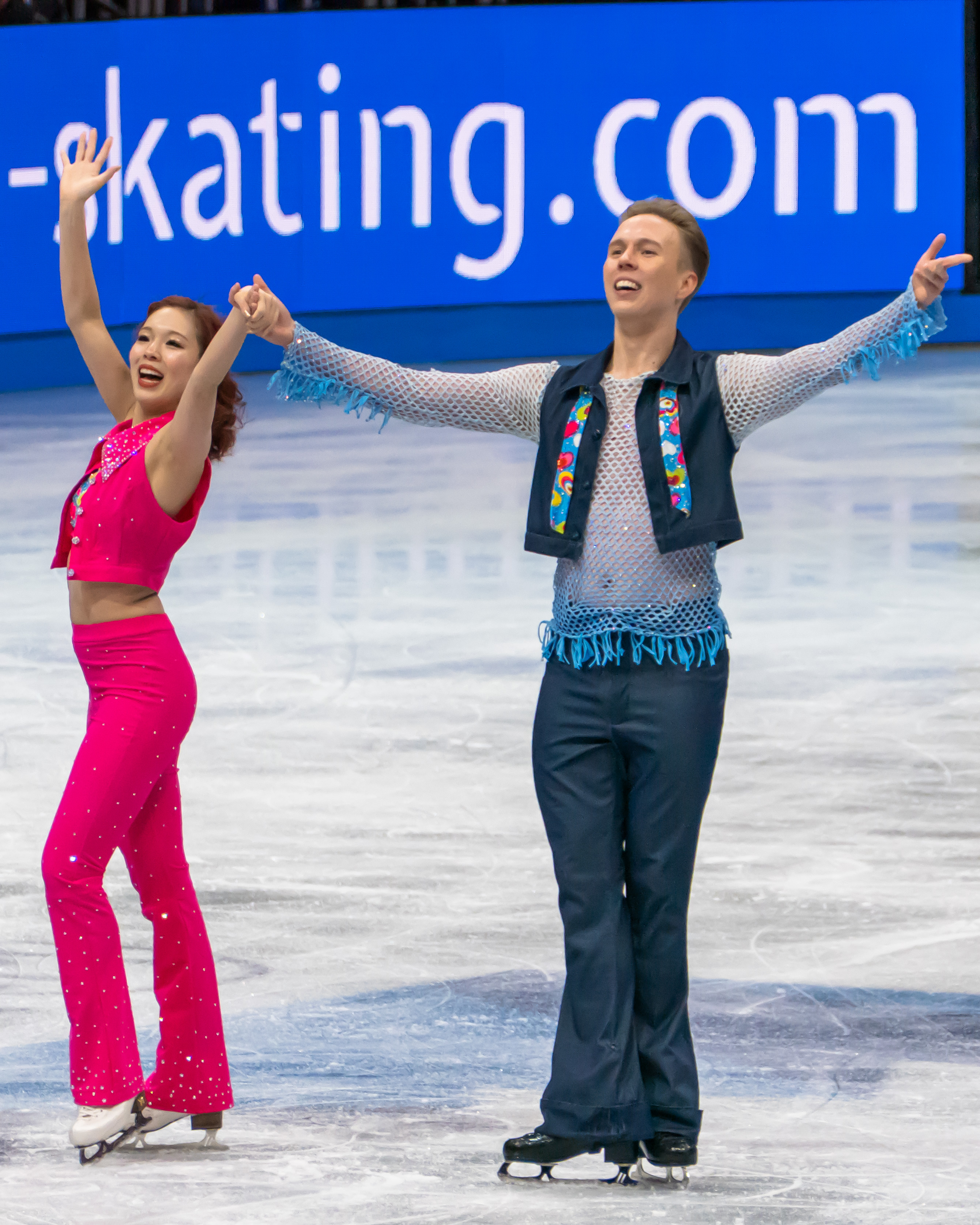
- Yuka Orihara and Juho Pirinen at the 2025 World Championships

Personal information
- Other names: 折原 裕香 紀藤 裕香
- Born: June 26, 2000 (age 26) Saitama, Japan
- Home town: Helsinki, Finland
- Height: 1.57 m (5 ft 2 in)

Figure skating career
- Country: Finland (since 2019); Canada (2018–19); Japan (2012–18)
- Discipline: Ice dance (since 2016); Women's singles (2012–15)
- Partner: Juho Pirinen (since 2019); Lee Royer (2018–19); Kanata Mori (2016–2018)
- Coach: Maurizio Margaglio; Neil Brown
- Skating club: Helsingin Luistelijat
- Began skating: 2006

Medal record
Finnish Championships
Gold medal – first place	2020 Vantaa	Ice dance
Silver medal – second place	2022 Pori	Ice dance
Silver medal – second place	2023 Joensuu	Ice dance
Silver medal – second place	2024 Helsinki	Ice dance
Silver medal – second place	2025 Rauma	Ice dance
Silver medal – second place	2026 Lahti	Ice dance

Yuka Orihara (折原 裕香, Orihara Yuka; born 26 June 2000) is a Japanese ice dancer who competes for Finland. With her current partner, Juho Pirinen, she is the 2026 CS Budapest Trophy bronze medalist, 2019–20 Finnish national champion and a five-time Finnish national silver medalist (2022–26).

== Personal life ==
Orihara was born on June 26, 2000, in Tokyo, Japan. Her mother, Shizuko, is a known costume designer in Japan, who in addition to designing her daughter's figure skating costumes, has also designed costumes for several known Japanese skaters including Yuzuru Hanyu, Shoma Uno, Kaori Sakamoto, Wakaba Higuchi, and Marin Honda.

Orihara originally competed under the name Yuka Kito (紀藤 裕香, Kito Yuka) before deciding to compete under her mother's last name in 2016.

In 2019, Orihara graduated from Renaissance High School in Daigo, Ibaraki, Japan. She is multilingual and able to speak Japanese, English, and Finnish.

== Career ==
=== Early career ===
Orihara began figure skating in 2006 at the age of six. While skating for Japan, she represented Musashino Senior High School. Originally a singles skater, she competed at the 2012–13 and 2014–15 Japan Junior Championships, finishing fifteenth and fourteenth respectively.

In 2016, Orihara decided that to give ice dance a try and teamed up with Kanata Mori. The duo skated together for two seasons. Orihara/Mori won silver at the 2016–17 Japan Junior Championships and placed fourth on the senior level at the 2016–18 Japan Championships. Their final competition together was the 2018 Mentor Toruń Cup, where they finished eleventh.

Given the lack of training rinks to practice ice dance in Japan, Orihara decided to move to British Columbia, Canada after a Japanese skating coach introduced her to Canadian ice dance coaches Megan Wing and Aaron Lowe. Soon after, she teamed up with Canadian ice dancer, Lee Royer. Together, they competed at the 2019 Canadian Junior Championships where they finished fifth. Their partnership dissolved after one season.

=== Partnership with Pirinen ===
==== 2019–20 season: Finnish national title ====
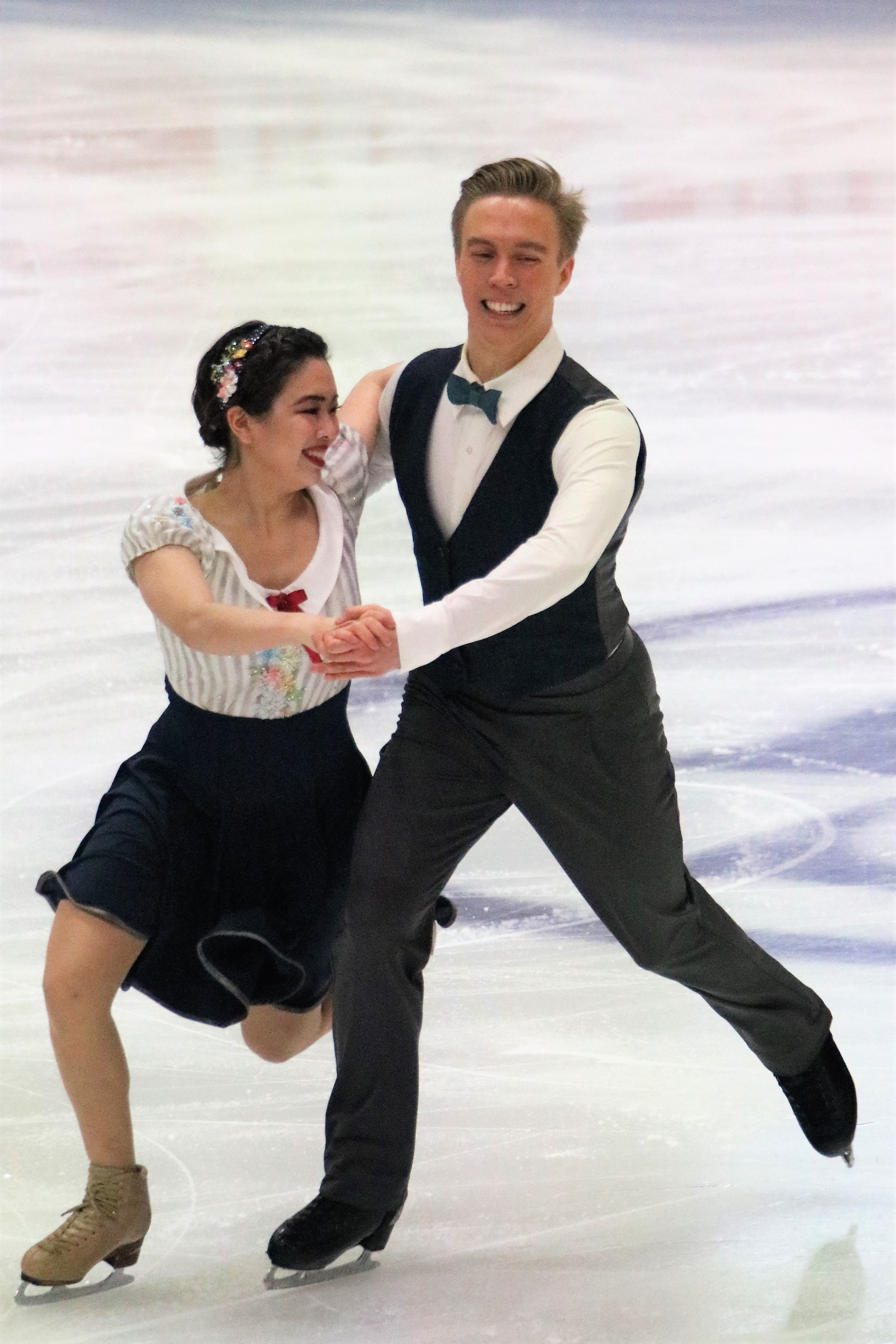
Orihara/Pirinen performing their rhythm dance at the 2020 European Championships

In spring 2019, Finland-based Italian ice dance coach, Maurizio Margaglio, who was acquainted with Orihara's then coaching team, contacted them, requesting that Orihara travel to Helsinki to have a try-out with his then partnerless student, Juho Pirinen. Orihara agreed to this request and following a successful tryout, she soon moved to Finland to train with Pirinen.

Deciding to represent Finland, the duo made their international debut at the 2019 CS Lombardia Trophy, where they finished eleventh. They then continued competing on the 2019–20 ISU Challenger Series, finishing fifth at the 2019 CS Warsaw Cup and seventh at the 2019 CS Finlandia Trophy. Orihara/Pirinen would also win bronze at the 2019 Volvo Open Cup and the 2019 Santa Claus Cup.

With top Finnish ice dancing team, Turkkila/Versluis not competing at the 2019–20 Finnish Championships, Orihara/Pirinen won the event by over forty points.

Selected to compete at the 2020 European Championships in Graz, Austria, the duo came in eighteenth place. They then closed their season with a fifth-place finish at the 2020 Egna Dance Trophy.

==== 2020–21 season ====
Although Orihara/Pirinen were assigned to make their Grand Prix series debut at the 2020 Internationaux de France, the event was cancelled due to the COVID-19 pandemic.

The duo would not compete for the rest of the season.

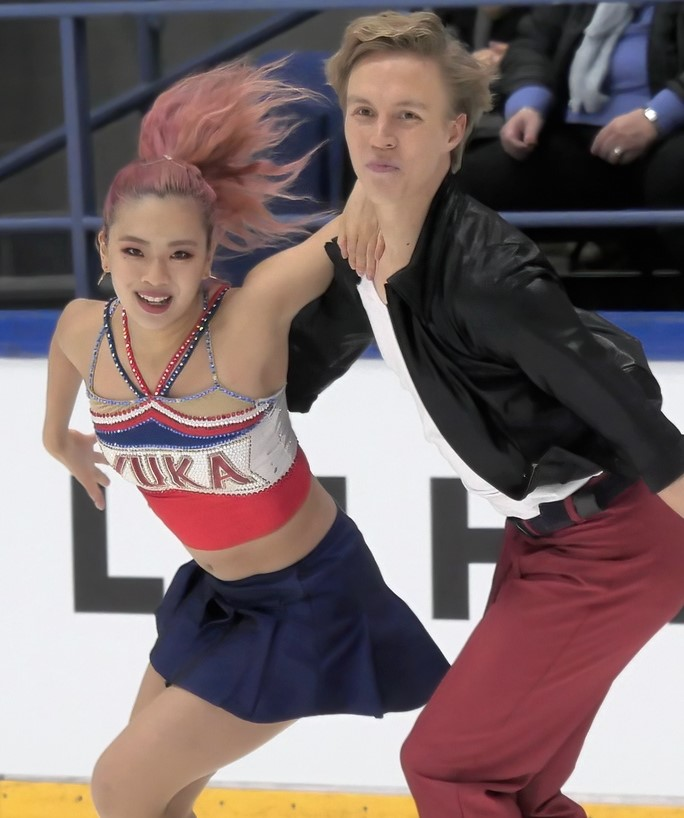
Orihara and Pirinen at the 2021 CS Finlandia Trophy

==== 2021–22 season ====
Competing on the 2021–22 ISU Challenger Series, Orihara/Pirinen finished fifteenth at the 2021 CS Lombardia Trophy and twelfth at the 2021 CS Finlandia Trophy. They would follow it up with a fourth-place finish and a gold medal at the 2021 Trophée Métropole Nice Côte d'Azur and the 2021 NRW Trophy, respectively.

In December, Orihara/Pirinen won the silver medal at the 2021–22 Finnish Championships. They would end their season with another silver medal at the 2022 International Challenge Cup.

==== 2022–23 season: Grand Prix debut ====
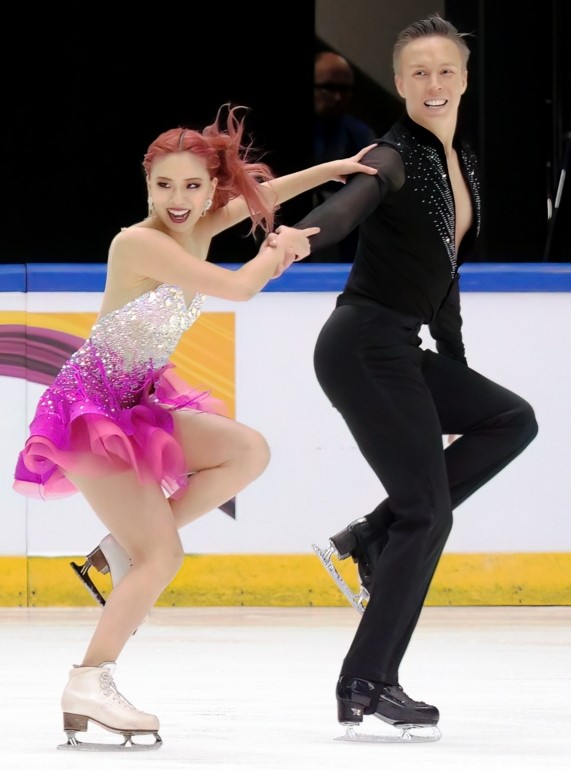
Orihara/Pirinen during their rhythm dance at the 2022 CS Finlandia Trophy

Beginning their season on the 2022–23 ISU Challenger Series, Orihara/Pirinen placed fourth at the 2022 CS Nepela Memorial and sixth at the 2022 CS Finlandia Trophy. They subsequently finished fourth at the 2022 Trophée Métropole Nice Côte d'Azur.

Debuting on the 2022–23 Grand Prix series, the duo finished eighth at the 2022 NHK Trophy and seventh at the 2022 Grand Prix of Espoo.

In December, they won their second consecutive silver medal at the 2022–23 Finnish Championships. Orihara/Pirinen would then end their season by winning silver at the 2022 Bavarian Open and bronze at the 2022 International Challenge Cup.

==== 2023–24 season: World Championships debut ====
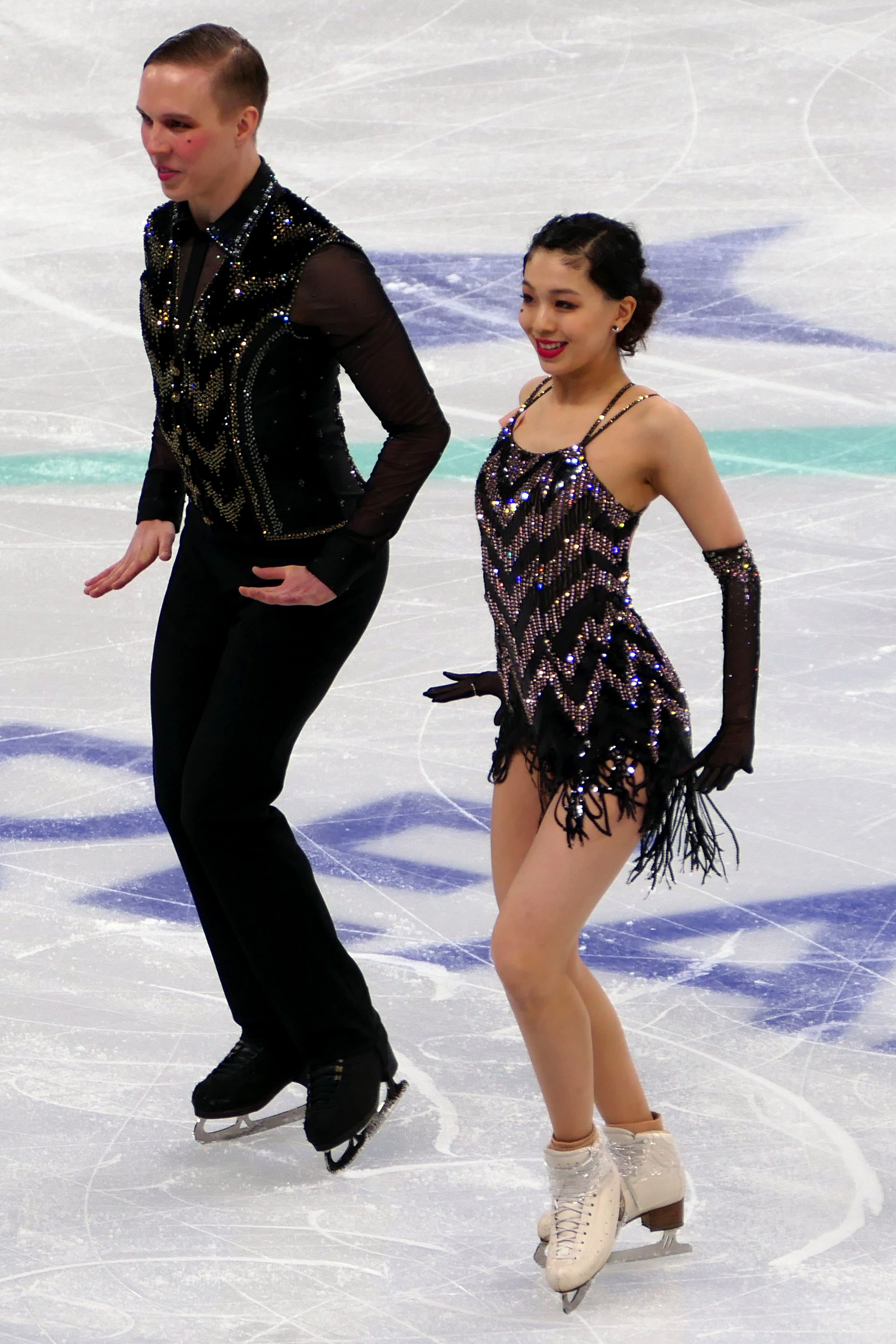
Orihara/Pirinen performing their free dance at the 2024 World Championships

Orihara/Pirinen started the season by competing 2023–24 ISU Challenger Series, finishing sixth at the 2023 CS Nepela Memorial and at the 2023 CS Finlandia Trophy. They subsequently took gold at the 2023 Mezzaluna Cup.

Going on to compete at the 2023 Grand Prix of Espoo, Orihara/Pirinen finished sixth. They then won silver at the 2023–24 Finnish Championships. Selected to compete at the 2024 European Championships in Kaunas, Lithuania, the duo finished tenth.

With Finland having two berths for ice dance at the 2024 World Championships in Montreal, Quebec, Canada, Orihara/Pirinen would make their World Championship debut in March, coming in sixteenth place.

==== 2024–25 season ====
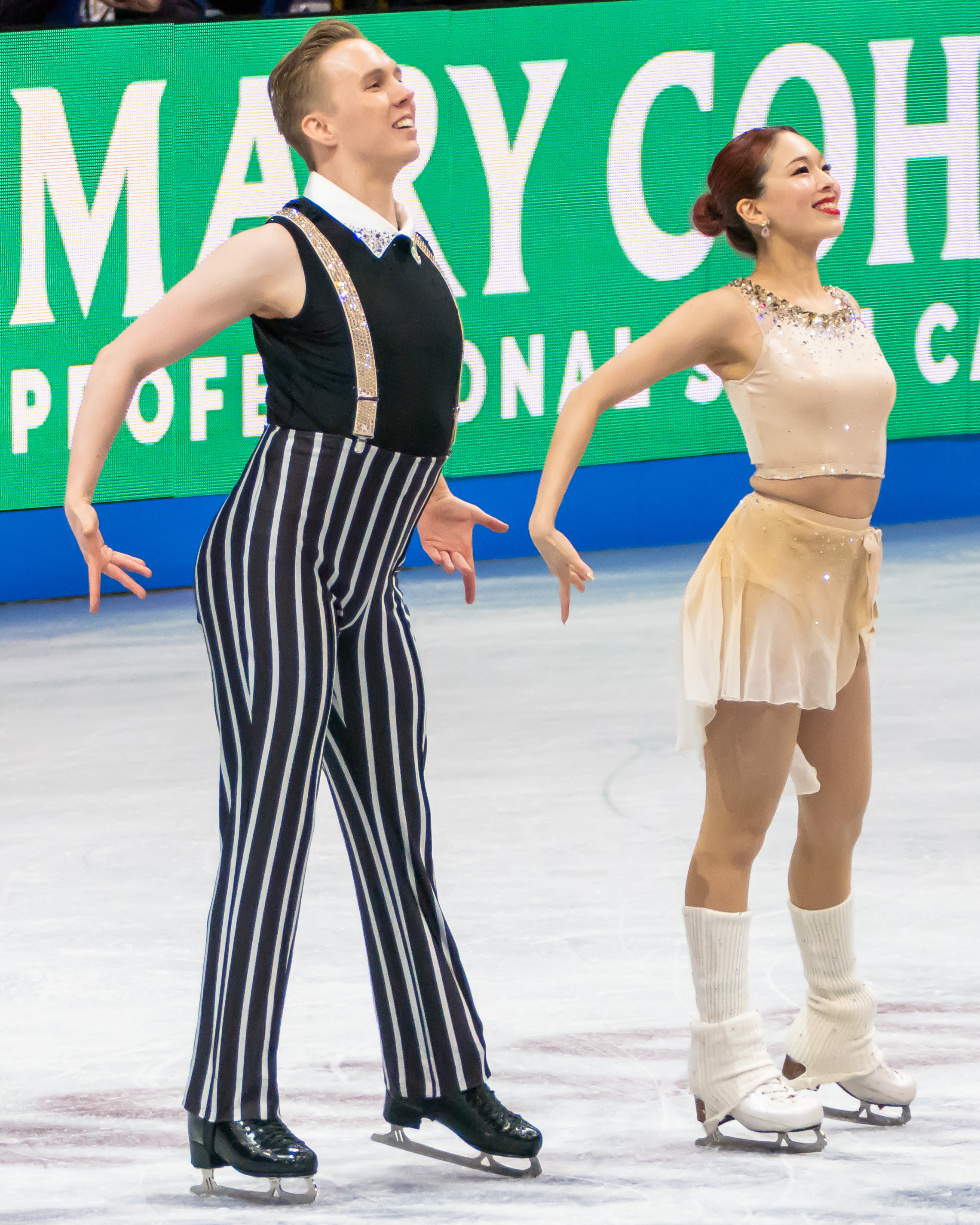
Orihara/Pirinen performing their free dance at the 2025 World Championships

Orihara/Pirinen began the season by competing on the 2024–25 ISU Challenger Series, finishing fourth at both the 2024 CS Budapest Trophy and the 2024 CS Trophée Métropole Nice Côte d'Azur. Going on to compete on the 2024–25 Grand Prix circuit, they finished sixth at the 2024 NHK Trophy and the 2024 Finlandia Trophy.

In December, Orihara/Pirinen won the silver medal at the 2025 Finnish Championships.

Following a fourth-place finish at the 2025 Sofia Trophy, Orihara/Pirinen competed at the 2025 European Championships in Tallinn, Estonia. There, they scored personal bests in all competition segments and finished in seventh place overall. The following month, the pair won the silver medal at the 2025 International Challenge Cup.

Orihara/Pirinen subsequently closed the season by finishing fourteenth at the 2025 World Championships in Boston, Massachusetts, United States. Their placement, in addition to Turkkila/Versluis's eleventh-place finish, won Finland two quotas for ice dance at the 2026 Winter Olympics.

==== 2025–26 season ====
In August, it was announced that Orihara/Pirinen would not be able to participate at the 2026 Winter Olympics due to Orihara not yet obtaining Finnish citizenship. They opened the season by placing sixth at the 2025 CS Nepela Memorial and winning gold at the 2025 Mezzaluna Cup. Going on to compete on the 2025–26 Grand Prix series, placing eighth at the 2025 NHK Trophy and seventh at the 2025 Finlandia Trophy.

In December, they won the silver medal at the 2026 Finnish Championships behind Turkkila/Versluis. The following month, they finished twelfth at the 2026 European Championships in Sheffield, England, United Kingdom.

At the 2026 World Figure Skating Championships, the pair finished in 22nd place in the rhythm dance and did not advance to the free dance.

== Programs ==
=== Ice dance with Juho Pirinen ===
Season	Rhythm dance	Free dance	Exhibition
2025–2026	Wannabe; If U Can't Dance; Stop; Spice Up Your Life by Spice Girls choreo. by Massimo Scali, Sini Parkkinen, Luca Lanotte, Matteo Dal Prà	Moulin Rouge!; Welcome To The Moulin Rouge! by Bob Crewe, Kenny Nolan, & Justin Levine; Backstage Romance by Stefani Germanotta & Nadir Khayat; So Exciting! (The Pitch Song); More More More! (Encore) by Fatboy Slim, Jim Abbiss, & Ben Hillier choreo. by Massimo Scali, Sini Parkkinen, Luca Lanotte, Matteo Dal Prà	Can't Wait Until Tonight by Max Mutzke; A Chorus Line; Opening: I Hope I Get It; One; One (Finale) by A Chorus Line Ensemble choreo. by Massimo Scali, Sini Parkkinen; Mary Poppins Returns; Overture by Marc Shaiman & Scott Wittman; Trip a Little Light Fantastic performed by Lin-Manuel Miranda; End Title Suite Overture by Marc Shaiman & Scott Wittman
2024–2025	Disco Inferno by The Trammps; Love to You Baby by Donna Summer; Y.M.C.A. by Village People choreo. by Massimo Scali, Sini Parkkinen	A Chorus Line; Opening: I Hope I Get It; One; One (Finale) by A Chorus Line Ensemble choreo. by Massimo Scali, Sini Parkkinen	
2023–2024	Like a Prayer; Love Song; Express Yourself by Madonna choreo. by Massimo Scali, Luca Lanotte, Nicolò Tacchetto, Sini Parkkinen	Chicago; When You're Good to Mama performed by Queen Latifah; Nowadays performed by Renée Zellweger; Nowadays/Hot Honey Rag performed by Renée Zellweger & Catherine Zeta-Jones by John Kander & Fred Ebb choreo. by Massimo Scali, Luca Lanotte, Nicolò Tacchetto, Sini Parkkinen	Jet Set (from Catch Me If You Can) performed by Aaron Tveit & Company of the Original Cast
2022–2023	Cha Cha: I Like It Like That by Pete Rodriguez performed by The Blackout All-Stars; Rhumba: Dancing with a Stranger by Sam Smith performed by Klaus Hallen Tanz Orchester; Samba: La Percussion by Ottomix & Yano; Samba: Instruction by Jax Jones ft. Demi Lovato & Stefflon Don performed by DJ Ice choreo. by Neil Brown, Luca Lanotte, Matteo Zanni	My Jolly Sailor Bold by Ashley Serena; We're Sinking by E. Shepherd Stevenson & Christopher Lloyd choreo. by Neil Brown, Luca Lanotte, Matteo Zanni	Mary Poppins Returns; Overture by Marc Shaiman & Scott Wittman; Trip a Little Light Fantastic performed by Lin-Manuel Miranda; End Title Suite Overture by Marc Shaiman & Scott Wittman
2021–2022	Blues: Lean on Me by Bill Withers; Funk: Give Up the Funk by Parliament both performed by Glee cast (from Glee) choreo. by Neil Brown, Paola Mezzadri, Luca Lanotte, Maurizio Margaglio, Sini Parkkinen	Gabriel's Oboe (from The Mission) by Ennio Morricone choreo. by Neil Brown, Paola Mezzadri, Luca Lanotte, Maurizio Margaglio, Sini Parkkinen	
2020–2021	Mary Poppins Returns; Quickstep: Overture by Marc Shaiman & Scott Wittman; Waltz: Trip a Little Light Fantastic performed by Lin-Manuel Miranda; End Title Suite Overture by Marc Shaiman & Scott Wittman choreo. by Paola Mezzadri, Luca Lanotte	Gabriel's Oboe (from The Mission) by Ennio Morricone choreo. by Neil Brown, Paola Mezzadri, Luca Lanotte, Maurizio Margaglio, Sini Parkkinen	
2019–2020	Mary Poppins Returns; Quickstep: Overture by Marc Shaiman & Scott Wittman; Waltz: Trip a Little Light Fantastic performed by Lin-Manuel Miranda; End Title Suite Overture by Marc Shaiman & Scott Wittman choreo. by Paola Mezzadri, Luca Lanotte	Near Light by Ólafur Arnalds; Waves by Dean Lewis choreo. by Paola Mezzadri, Megan Wing, Aaron Lowe, Neil Brown	

== Competitive highlights ==
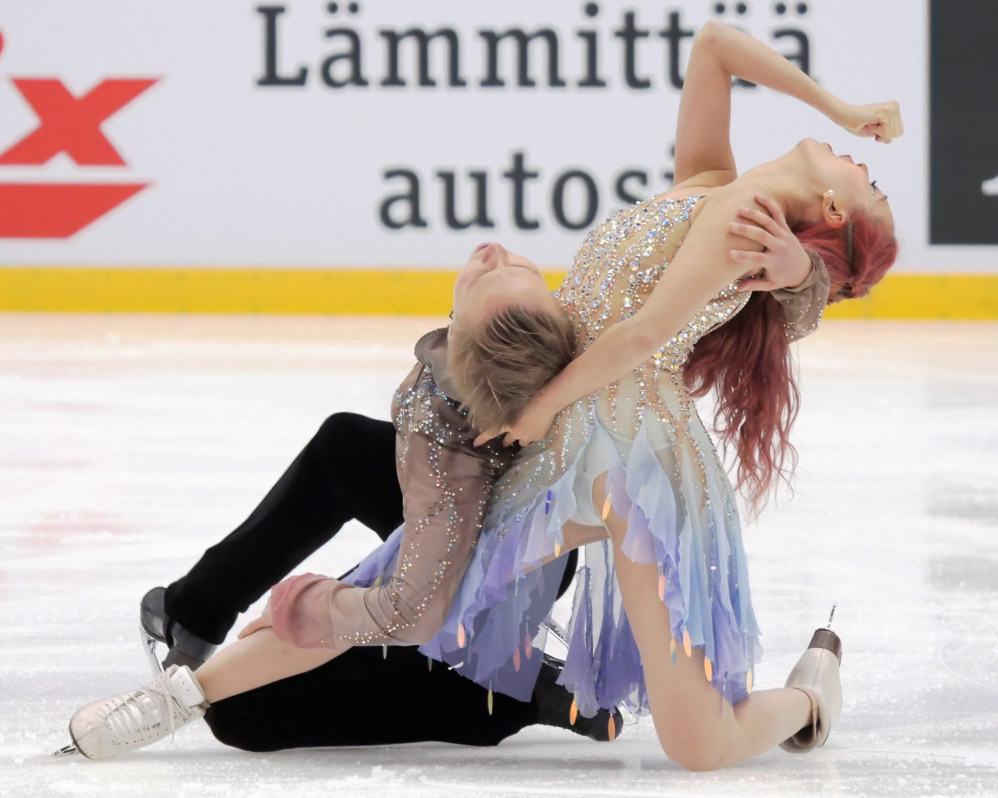
Orihara/Pirinen at the end of their free dance at the 2022 CS Finlandia Trophy

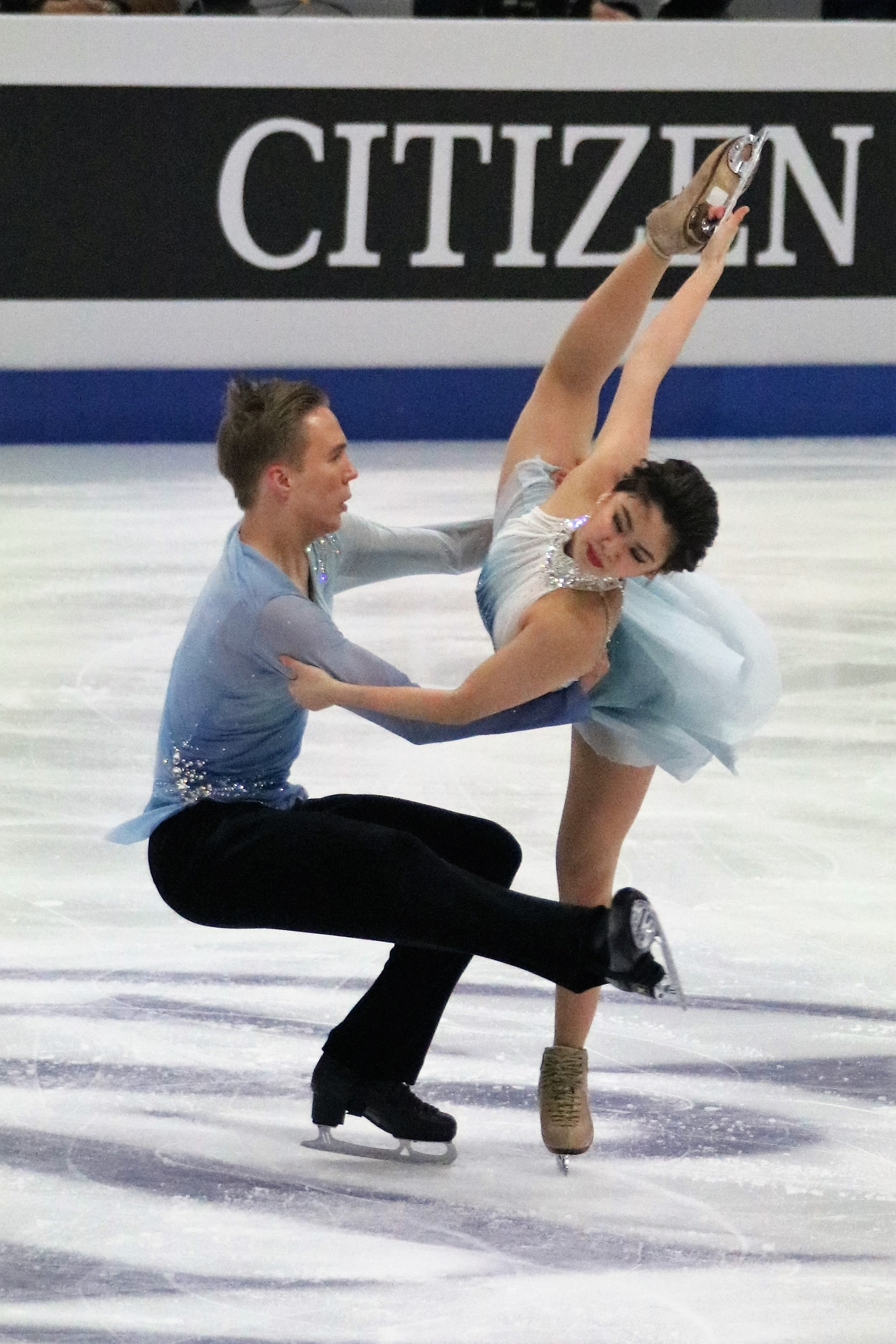
Orihara/Pirinen performing a spin during their free dance at the 2020 European Championships

- GP – Event of the ISU Grand Prix Series
- CS – Event of the ISU Challenger Series
- TBD – Assigned
- WD – Withdrew from competition

=== Ice dance with Juho Pirinen for Finland ===
Competition placements at senior level
Season	2019–20	2020–21	2021–22	2022–23	2023–24	2024–25	2025–26	2026-27
World Championships					16th	14th	22nd	
European Championships	18th				10th	7th	12th	
Finnish Championships	1st	C	2nd	2nd	2nd	2nd	2nd	
GP Finland				7th	6th	6th	7th	TBD
GP France		C						
GP NHK Trophy				8th		6th	8th	TBD
CS Budapest Trophy						4th		3rd
CS Denis Ten Memorial						WD		
CS Finlandia Trophy	7th		12th	6th	6th			
CS Lombardia Trophy	11th		15th					4th
CS Nepela Memorial	5th			4th	6th		6th	6th
CS Trophée Métropole Nice						4th		
CS Warsaw Cup			5th					
Bavarian Open				2nd				
Challenge Cup			2nd	3rd		2nd		
Egna Dance Trophy	5th							
Mezzaluna Cup					1st		1st	
NRW Trophy			1st					
Santa Claus Cup	3rd							
Sofia Trophy						4th		
Trophée Métropole Nice			4th	4th				
Volvo Open Cup	3rd							

=== Ice dance with Lee Royer for Canada ===
Competition placements at junior level
Season	2018–19
Canadian Championships	5th

=== Ice dance with Kanata Mori for Japan ===
Competition placements at junior and senior level
Season	2016–17	2017–18
Japanese Championships		4th
Japanese Junior Championships	2nd	
Mentor Toruń Cup		11th

=== Women's singles for Japan ===
Competition placements at junior level
Season	2012–13	2014–15
Japanese Championships	15th	14th

== Detailed results ==
=== Ice dance with Juho Pirinen ===
ISU personal best scores in the +5/-5 GOE System
Segment	Type	Score	Event
Total	TSS	193.94	2025 European Championships
Rhythm dance	TSS	75.70	2025 European Championships
Rhythm dance	TES	43.32	2025 European Championships
Rhythm dance	PCS	32.38	2025 European Championships
Free dance	TSS	118.24	2025 European Championships
Free dance	TES	67.60	2025 European Championships
Free dance	PCS	50.64	2025 European Championships

Results in the 2019–20 season
Date	Event	RD		FD		Total	
Date	Event	P	Score	P	Score	P	Score
Sep 13–15, 2019	(Italy) 2019 CS Lombardia Trophy	11	57.94	10	90.54	11	148.48
Sep 20–21, 2019	(Slovakia) 2019 CS Nepela Memorial	5	67.01	6	99.92	5	166.93
Oct 11–13, 2019	(Finland) 2019 CS Finlandia Trophy	7	62.19	7	95.53	7	157.72
Nov 5–10, 2019	(Latvia) 2019 Volvo Open Cup	3	67.48	3	96.89	3	164.37
Dec 2–8, 2019	(Hungary) 2019 Santa Claus Cup	2	70.16	5	96.42	3	166.58
Dec 13–15, 2019	(Finland) 2020 Finnish Championships	1	70.15	1	102.75	1	172.90
Jan 20–26, 2020	(Austria) 2020 European Championships	16	64.49	19	91.59	18	156.08
Feb 7–9, 2020	(Italy) 2020 Egna Dance Trophy	5	70.76	6	97.99	5	168.75

Results in the 2021–22 season
Date	Event	RD		FD		Total	
Date	Event	P	Score	P	Score	P	Score
Nov 9–12, 2021	(Italy) 2021 CS Lombardia Trophy	15	57.98	16	86.82	15	144.80
Oct 7–10, 2021	(Finland) 2023 CS Finlandia Trophy	13	61.18	12	97.33	12	158.51
Oct 20–24, 2021	(France) 2021 Trophée Métropole Nice Côte d'Azur	4	62.84	6	92.38	4	155.22
Nov 4–7, 2021	(Germany) 2021 NRW Trophy	3	60.79	1	102.20	1	162.99
Nov 18–20, 2021	(Poland) 2021 CS Warsaw Cup	6	71.56	5	105.21	5	176.77
Dec 17–19, 2021	(Finland) 2022 Finnish Championships	2	70.69	2	105.63	2	176.32
Feb 24–27, 2022	(Netherlands) 2022 Challenge Cup	2	65.31	2	104.08	2	169.39

Results in the 2022–23 season
Date	Event	RD		FD		Total	
Date	Event	P	Score	P	Score	P	Score
Sep 29 – Oct 1, 2022	(Slovakia) 2022 CS Nepela Memorial	4	62.34	3	102.98	4	165.32
Oct 6–9, 2022	(Finland) 2022 CS Finlandia Trophy	6	68.81	5	101.36	6	170.17
Oct 19–23, 2022	(France) 2022 Trophée Métropole Nice Côte d'Azur	4	64.50	4	96.16	4	160.66
Nov 18–20, 2022	(Japan) 2022 NHK Trophy	9	66.47	8	101.98	8	168.45
Nov 25–27, 2022	(Finland) 2022 Grand Prix of Espoo	8	69.13	6	104.04	7	173.17
Dec 16–18, 2022	(Finland) 2023 Finnish Championships	2	74.73	2	106.44	2	181.17
Jan 31 – Feb 5, 2023	(Germany) 2023 Bavarian Open	2	72.52	3	105.37	2	177.89
Feb 23–26, 2023	(Netherlands) 2023 Challenge Cup	3	69.06	2	108.11	3	177.17

Results in the 2023–24 season
Date	Event	RD		FD		Total	
Date	Event	P	Score	P	Score	P	Score
Sep 28–30, 2023	(Slovakia) 2023 CS Nepela Memorial	7	65.62	6	105.91	6	171.53
Oct 6–8, 2023	(Finland) 2023 CS Finlandia Trophy	6	67.93	4	106.80	6	174.73
Oct 20–22, 2023	(Italy) 2023 Mezzaluna Cup	1	73.76	1	115.25	1	189.01
Nov 17–19, 2023	(Finland) 2023 Grand Prix of Espoo	7	69.52	6	107.21	6	176.73
Dec 15–17, 2023	(Finland) 2024 Finnish Championships	2	75.80	2	110.47	2	186.27
Jan 8–14, 2024	(Lithuania) 2024 European Championships	10	68.59	9	111.12	10	179.71
Mar 18–24, 2024	(Canada) 2024 World Championships	17	68.66	16	107.33	16	175.99

Results in the 2024–25 season
Date	Event	RD		FD		Total	
Date	Event	P	Score	P	Score	P	Score
Oct 11–13, 2024	(Hungary) 2024 CS Budapest Trophy	5	70.25	4	108.25	4	178.50
Oct 16–20, 2024	(France) 2024 CS Trophée Métropole Nice Côte d'Azur	4	71.24	3	109.24	4	180.48
Nov 8–10, 2024	(Japan) 2024 NHK Trophy	7	67.34	6	107.94	6	175.28
Nov 15–17, 2024	(Finland) 2024 Finlandia Trophy	8	72.56	6	111.08	6	183.64
Dec 13–15, 2024	(Finland) 2025 Finnish Championships	2	77.21	2	114.87	2	192.08
Jan 7–12, 2025	(Bulgaria) 2025 Sofia Trophy	4	66.81	2	108.17	4	174.98
Jan 28 – Feb 2, 2025	(Estonia) 2025 European Championships	8	75.70	6	118.24	7	193.94
Feb 13–16, 2025	(Netherlands) 2025 Challenge Cup	2	70.81	2	112.68	2	183.49
Mar 25–30, 2025	(United States) 2025 World Championships	11	73.98	14	110.74	14	184.72

Results in the 2025–26 season
Date	Event	RD		FD		Total	
Date	Event	P	Score	P	Score	P	Score
Sep 25–27, 2025	(Slovakia) 2025 CS Nepela Memorial	6	71.78	6	102.12	6	173.90
Oct 15–19, 2025	(Italy) 2025 Mezzaluna Cup	1	75.65	1	109.96	1	185.61
Nov 7–9, 2025	(Japan) 2025 NHK Trophy	10	67.93	8	107.59	8	175.72
Nov 21–23, 2025	(Finland) 2025 Finlandia Trophy	8	69.39	7	107.38	7	176.77
Dec 12–14, 2025	(Finland) 2026 Finnish Championships	2	74.99	2	116.24	2	191.23
Jan 13–18, 2026	(United Kingdom) 2026 European Championships	16	64.99	11	110.77	12	175.76
Mar 24–29, 2026	(Czech Republic) 2026 World Championships	22	67.45	—N/a	—N/a	22	67.45

Results in the 2026–27 season
Date	Event	RD		FD		Total	
Date	Event	P	Score	P	Score	P	Score
Sep 17–20, 2026	(Italy) 2026 CS Lombardia Trophy	3	71.93	4	103.11	4	175.04
Sep 24–27, 2026	(Slovakia) 2026 CS Nepela Memorial	5	73.79	6	104.93	6	178.72
Oct 15–18, 2026	(Hungary) 2026 CS Budapest Trophy	4	74.10	2	108.63	3	182.73
