= 2020 World Junior Figure Skating Championships =

- Type: ISU Championship
- Date: March 2 – 8
- Season: 2019–20
- Location: Tallinn, Estonia
- Host: Estonian Figure Skating Federation
- Venue: Tondiraba Ice Hall

Champions
- Men's singles: (Russia) Andrei Mozalev
- Ladies' singles: (Russia) Kamila Valieva
- Pairs: (Russia) Apollinariia Panfilova / Dmitry Rylov
- Ice dance: (United States) Avonley Nguyen / Vadym Kolesnik
- Previous: 2019 World Junior Championships
- Next: 2022 World Junior Championships

The 2020 World Junior Figure Skating Championships were held in Tallinn, Estonia on March 2–8, 2020. Figure skaters competed for the title of junior world champion in men's singles, ladies' singles, pairs, and ice dance. The competition determined the entry quotas for each federation during the 2020–21 ISU Junior Grand Prix series and at the 2021 World Junior Championships.

== Qualification ==
=== Age and minimum TES requirements ===
Skaters who reach the age of 13 before July 1, 2019, but have not turned 19 (singles and females of the other two disciplines) or 21 (male pair skaters and ice dancers) are eligible to compete at the junior level.

The ISU stipulates that the minimum scores must be achieved at an ISU-recognized junior international competition in the ongoing or preceding season, no later than 21 days before the first official practice day.

Minimum technical scores (TES)
Discipline	SP / RD	FS / FD
Men	23	42
Ladies	23	38
Pairs	23	34
Ice dance	23	37
Must be achieved at an ISU-recognized international event in the ongoing or preceding season. SP/RD and FS/FD scores may be attained at different events.

=== Number of entries per discipline ===
Based on the results of the 2019 World Junior Championships, each ISU member nation can field one to three entries per discipline.

Spots	Men	Ladies	Pairs	Dance
3	United States; Russia	Russia; United States	Russia; United States	Canada; Russia; United States
2	Italy; Canada; France; Georgia; Japan	Japan; South Korea; Canada	China; Israel; Ukraine; France; Canada	Georgia; France
If not listed above, one entry is allowed.

== Entries ==
Member nations began announcing their selections in December 2019. The International Skating Union published a complete of entries on February 12, 2020.

Country	Men	Ladies	Pairs	Ice dance
Armenia		Valeriia Sidorova		
Australia	Darian Kaptich	Victoria Alcântara		
Austria	Luc Maierhofer	Stefanie Pesendorfer		
Azerbaijan		Ekaterina Ryabova		Yulia Alieva / Artur Biktimirov
Belarus	Alexander Lebedev	Milana Ramashova		Karina Sidarenka / Maksim Yalenich
Bulgaria	Alexander Zlatkov	Maria Levushkina		
Canada	Stephen Gogolev; Joseph Phan	Kaiya Ruiter; Alison Schumacher	Patricia Andrew / Zachary Daleman; Kelly-Ann Laurin / Loucas Éthier	Emmy Bronsard / Aissa Bouaraguia; Natalie D'Alessandro / Bruce Waddell; Miku Makita / Tyler Gunara
China		Zhu Yi	Wang Huidi / Jia Ziqi; Wang Yuchen / Huang Yihang	
Chinese Taipei	Lin Fang-Yi	Ting Tzu-Han		
Croatia	Charles Henry Katanović	Hana Cvijanović		
Cyprus				Angelina Kudryavtseva / Ilia Karankevich
Czech Republic	Filip Ščerba	Nikola Rychtaříková		Natálie Taschlerová / Filip Taschler
Denmark		Maia Sørensen		Sara Buch-Weeke / Nicolas Woodcock
Estonia	Aleksandr Selevko	Niina Petrokina		Darja Netjaga / Marko Jevgeni Gaidajenko
Finland	Lauri Lankila	Vera Stolt		
France	Adam Siao Him Fa	Maïa Mazzara	Cléo Hamon / Denys Strekalin	Loïcia Demougeot / Théo Le Mercier; Lou Terreaux / Noé Perron
Georgia	Nika Egadze	Alina Urushadze	Alina Butaeva / Luka Berulava	Maria Kazakova / Georgy Reviya
Germany	Denis Gurdzhi	Nargiz Süleymanova	Annika Hocke / Robert Kunkel	Lara Luft / Stephano Valentino Schuster
Great Britain	Edward Appleby	Elena Komova		Emily Rose Brown / James Hernandez
Hong Kong		Cheuk Ka Kahlen Cheung		
Hungary		Regina Schermann		Villő Marton / Danyil Semko
Iceland		Aldís Kara Bergsdóttir		
Israel	Mark Gorodnitsky	Nelli Ioffe		Mariia Nosovitskaya / Mikhail Nosovitskiy
Italy	Gabriele Frangipani; Daniel Grassl	Alessia Tornaghi	Alyssa Montan / Manuel Piazza	Carolina Portesi Peroni / Michael Chrastecky
Japan	Yuma Kagiyama; Shun Sato	Tomoe Kawabata; Mana Kawabe		Utana Yoshida / Shingo Nishiyama
Kazakhstan	Mikhail Shaidorov			Anna Shnaider / Fedor Varlamov
Latvia		Anete Lāce		
Lithuania		Jogailė Aglinskytė		
Mexico		Andrea Montesinos Cantú		
Netherlands		Lindsay van Zundert		
New Zealand		Jocelyn Hong		
Poland	Kornel Witkowski	Ekaterina Kurakova		Oliwia Borowska / Filip Bojanowski
Romania		Ana Sofia Beşchea		
Russia	Petr Gumennik; Andrei Mozalev; Ilya Yablokov	Maiia Khromykh; Daria Usacheva; Kamila Valieva	Kseniia Akhanteva / Valerii Kolesov; Iuliia Artemeva / Mikhail Nazarychev; Apollinariia Panfilova / Dmitry Rylov	Diana Davis / Gleb Smolkin; Elizaveta Shanaeva / Devid Naryzhnyy; Arina Ushakova / Maxim Nekrasov
Serbia		Darja Mijatović		
Slovakia	Adam Hagara	Alexandra Michaela Filcová		
South Korea	Lee Si-hyeong	Lee Hae-in; Wi Seo-yeong		
Spain	Pablo García	Marian Millares		Sofia Val / Linus Colmor Jepsen
Sweden	Nikolaj Majorov	Emelie Ling	Greta Crafoord / John Crafoord	
Switzerland	Noah Bodenstein	Anaïs Coraducci		Gina Zehnder / Beda Leon Sieber
Turkey	Başar Oktar	Yasemin Zeki		
Ukraine	Ivan Shmuratko	Anastasiia Shabotova	Kateryna Dzitsiuk / Ivan Pavlov	Maria Golubtsova / Kirill Belobrov
United States	Ilia Malinin; Maxim Naumov; Andrew Torgashev	Starr Andrews; Alysa Liu; Lindsay Thorngren	Winter Deardorff / Mikhail Johnson; Kate Finster / Balazs Nagy; Anastasiia Smirnova / Danil Siianytsia	Oona Brown / Gage Brown; Avonley Nguyen / Vadym Kolesnik; Katarina Wolfkostin / Jeffrey Chen

=== Changes to preliminary entries ===
Date	Discipline	Withdrew	Added	Reason/Other notes	Refs
February 17, 2020	Ladies	(Turkey) Güzide Irmak Bayır	(Turkey) Yasemin Zeki		
February 18, 2020	Ladies	N/A	(China) Zhu Yi		
February 24, 2020	Ladies	(Canada) Emily Bausback	(Canada) Alison Schumacher	Further consideration	
February 25, 2020	Men	(Thailand) Micah Kai Lynette	N/A		
February 28, 2020	Men	(Russia) Daniil Samsonov	(Russia) Ilya Yablokov	Health issues	
March 2, 2020	Men	(Azerbaijan) Vladimir Litvintsev	N/A		

== Medal summary ==
=== Medalists ===
Medals awarded to the skaters who achieve the highest overall placements in each discipline:

Discipline	Gold	Silver	Bronze
Men	(Russia) Andrei Mozalev	(Japan) Yuma Kagiyama	(Russia) Petr Gumennik
Ladies	(Russia) Kamila Valieva	(Russia) Daria Usacheva	(United States) Alysa Liu
Pairs	(Russia) Apollinariia Panfilova / Dmitry Rylov	(Russia) Kseniia Akhanteva / Valerii Kolesov	(Russia) Iuliia Artemeva / Mikhail Nazarychev
Ice dance	(United States) Avonley Nguyen / Vadym Kolesnik	(Georgia (country)) Maria Kazakova / Georgy Reviya	(Russia) Elizaveta Shanaeva / Devid Naryzhnyy

Small medals awarded to the skaters who achieve the highest short program or rhythm dance placements in each discipline:

Discipline	Gold	Silver	Bronze
Men	(Japan) Yuma Kagiyama	(Russia) Andrei Mozalev	(United States) Andrew Torgashev
Ladies	(Russia) Kamila Valieva	(South Korea) Lee Hae-in	(Russia) Daria Usacheva
Pairs	(Russia) Apollinariia Panfilova / Dmitry Rylov	(Russia) Kseniia Akhanteva / Valerii Kolesov	(Russia) Iuliia Artemeva / Mikhail Nazarychev
Ice dance	(Russia) Elizaveta Shanaeva / Devid Naryzhnyy	(Georgia (country)) Maria Kazakova / Georgy Reviya	(United States) Avonley Nguyen / Vadym Kolesnik

Medals awarded to the skaters who achieve the highest free skating or free dance placements in each discipline:

Discipline	Gold	Silver	Bronze
Men	(Russia) Andrei Mozalev	(Russia) Petr Gumennik	(Italy) Daniel Grassl
Ladies	(Russia) Kamila Valieva	(Russia) Daria Usacheva	(United States) Alysa Liu
Pairs	(Russia) Apollinariia Panfilova / Dmitry Rylov	(Russia) Kseniia Akhanteva / Valerii Kolesov	(Germany) Annika Hocke / Robert Kunkel
Ice dance	(United States) Avonley Nguyen / Vadym Kolesnik	(Georgia (country)) Maria Kazakova / Georgy Reviya	(Russia) Elizaveta Shanaeva / Devid Naryzhnyy

=== Medals by country ===
Table of medals for overall placement:

Rank	Nation	Gold	Silver	Bronze	Total
1	Russia	3	2	3	8
2	United States	1	0	1	2
3	Georgia	0	1	0	1
3	Japan	0	1	0	1
Totals (4 entries)		4	4	4	12

== Records ==
The following new ISU best scores were set during this competition:

Event	Component	Skater(s)	Score	Date	Ref
Pairs	Short program	(Russia) Apollinariia Panfilova / Dmitry Rylov	73.71	March 4, 2020	
Ice dance	Free dance	(Georgia (country)) Maria Kazakova / Georgy Reviya	106.21	March 7, 2020	
Ice dance	Free dance	(United States) Avonley Nguyen / Vadym Kolesnik	108.91	March 7, 2020	
Ice dance	Total score	(Georgia (country)) Maria Kazakova / Georgy Reviya	176.19	March 7, 2020	
Ice dance	Total score	(United States) Avonley Nguyen / Vadym Kolesnik	177.18	March 7, 2020	
Ladies	Free skating	(Russia) Kamila Valieva	152.38	March 7, 2020	
Ladies	Total score	(Russia) Kamila Valieva	227.30	March 7, 2020	

== Results ==
=== Men ===
Rank	Name	Nation	Total points	SP		FS	
1	Andrei Mozalev	Russia	245.09	2	84.31	1	160.78
2	Yuma Kagiyama	Japan	231.75	1	85.82	5	145.93
3	Petr Gumennik	Russia	231.12	9	76.07	2	155.05
4	Daniel Grassl	Italy	229.38	6	78.91	3	150.47
5	Maxim Naumov	United States	225.10	10	75.20	4	149.90
6	Shun Sato	Japan	221.62	5	79.30	6	142.32
7	Adam Siao Him Fa	France	213.89	12	74.61	7	139.28
8	Andrew Torgashev	United States	208.95	3	81.50	11	127.45
9	Aleksandr Selevko	Estonia	207.00	4	80.87	13	126.13
10	Ilya Yablokov	Russia	206.16	7	77.53	10	128.63
11	Lee Si-hyeong	South Korea	201.49	15	71.61	8	129.88
12	Joseph Phan	Canada	201.24	8	77.50	15	123.74
13	Nikolaj Majorov	Sweden	199.85	14	72.49	12	127.36
14	Gabriele Frangipani	Italy	198.41	11	75.05	16	123.36
15	Ivan Shmuratko	Ukraine	197.40	16	68.76	9	128.64
16	Ilia Malinin	United States	195.97	13	74.02	18	121.95
17	Stephen Gogolev	Canada	191.45	18	67.27	14	124.18
18	Nika Egadze	Georgia	180.66	22	58.22	17	122.44
19	Başar Oktar	Turkey	180.37	20	61.91	19	118.46
20	Denis Gurdzhi	Germany	178.08	17	67.81	21	110.27
21	Mark Gorodnitsky	Israel	168.90	23	57.96	20	110.94
22	Mikhail Shaidorov	Kazakhstan	164.09	24	56.37	22	107.72
23	Alexander Lebedev	Belarus	163.40	19	66.12	23	97.28
24	Filip Ščerba	Czech Republic	146.97	21	59.86	24	87.11
Did not advance to free skating
25	Luc Maierhofer	Austria	55.22	25	55.22	—N/a	
26	Edward Appleby	Great Britain	54.56	26	54.56	—N/a	
27	Lin Fang-Yi	Chinese Taipei	51.91	27	51.91	—N/a	
28	Darian Kaptich	Australia	49.48	28	49.48	—N/a	
29	Kornel Witkowski	Poland	47.56	29	47.56	—N/a	
30	Pablo García	Spain	43.29	30	43.29	—N/a	
31	Noah Bodenstein	Switzerland	43.21	31	43.21	—N/a	
32	Charles Henry Katanović	Croatia	42.81	32	42.81	—N/a	
33	Adam Hagara	Slovakia	41.90	33	41.90	—N/a	
34	Lauri Lankila	Finland	41.69	34	41.69	—N/a	
WD	Alexander Zlatkov	Bulgaria	withdrew	withdrew from competition			

=== Ladies ===
Rank	Name	Nation	Total points	SP		FS	
1	Kamila Valieva	Russia	227.30	1	74.92	1	152.38
2	Daria Usacheva	Russia	207.74	3	68.45	2	139.29
3	Alysa Liu	United States	204.83	4	67.52	3	137.31
4	Maiia Khromykh	Russia	198.24	5	66.78	4	131.46
5	Lee Hae-in	South Korea	194.01	2	70.08	6	123.93
6	Wi Seo-yeong	South Korea	193.30	6	65.45	5	127.85
7	Ekaterina Kurakova	Poland	184.51	9	63.20	7	121.31
8	Starr Andrews	United States	180.87	7	65.31	8	115.56
9	Alison Schumacher	Canada	174.02	11	59.99	9	114.03
10	Ekaterina Ryabova	Azerbaijan	169.89	13	57.68	10	112.21
11	Mana Kawabe	Japan	169.62	8	64.47	13	105.15
12	Milana Ramashova	Belarus	169.16	12	59.65	11	109.51
13	Alessia Tornaghi	Italy	163.45	14	57.08	12	106.37
14	Tomoe Kawabata	Japan	159.47	10	62.85	16	96.62
15	Stefanie Pesendorfer	Austria	150.54	16	53.67	15	96.87
16	Maïa Mazzara	France	149.80	15	54.22	17	95.58
17	Ting Tzu-Han	Chinese Taipei	149.04	22	50.97	14	98.07
18	Alina Urushadze	Georgia	148.11	18	52.68	18	95.43
19	Nargiz Süleymanova	Germany	146.03	21	51.07	19	94.96
20	Anastasiia Shabotova	Ukraine	144.85	17	52.68	20	92.17
21	Anete Lāce	Latvia	137.36	20	51.74	21	85.62
22	Zhu Yi	China	132.42	24	50.43	22	81.99
23	Maria Levushkina	Bulgaria	129.31	23	50.60	23	78.71
24	Regina Schermann	Hungary	126.55	19	52.38	24	74.17
Did not advance to free skating
25	Vera Stolt	Finland	50.11	25	50.11	—N/a	
26	Lindsay Thorngren	United States	49.61	26	49.61	—N/a	
27	Nelli Ioffe	Israel	49.00	27	49.00	—N/a	
28	Emelie Ling	Sweden	48.58	28	48.58	—N/a	
29	Lindsay van Zundert	Netherlands	48.21	29	48.21	—N/a	
30	Marian Millares	Spain	47.54	30	47.54	—N/a	
31	Kaiya Ruiter	Canada	47.27	31	47.27	—N/a	
32	Anaïs Coraducci	Switzerland	46.94	32	46.94	—N/a	
33	Niina Petrokina	Estonia	46.56	33	46.56	—N/a	
34	Cheuk Ka Kahlen Cheung	Hong Kong	44.87	34	44.87	—N/a	
35	Aldís Kara Bergsdóttir	Iceland	44.85	35	44.85	—N/a	
36	Valeriia Sidorova	Armenia	44.37	36	44.37	—N/a	
37	Alexandra Michaela Filcová	Slovakia	42.81	37	42.81	—N/a	
38	Andrea Montesinos Cantú	Mexico	42.04	38	42.04	—N/a	
39	Maia Sørensen	Denmark	40.72	39	40.72	—N/a	
40	Elena Komova	Great Britain	39.11	40	39.11	—N/a	
41	Jogailė Aglinskytė	Lithuania	38.13	41	38.13	—N/a	
42	Victoria Alcantara	Australia	37.17	42	37.17	—N/a	
43	Hana Cvijanović	Croatia	36.92	43	36.92	—N/a	
44	Darja Mijatović	Serbia	36.19	44	36.19	—N/a	
45	Jocelyn Hong	New Zealand	34.66	45	34.66	—N/a	
46	Nikola Rychtaříková	Czech Republic	34.45	46	34.45	—N/a	
47	Ana Sofia Beşchea	Romania	33.77	47	33.77	—N/a	
WD	Yasemin Zeki	Turkey	withdrew	withdrew from competition			

=== Pairs ===
Rank	Name	Nation	Total points	SP		FS	
1	Apollinariia Panfilova / Dmitry Rylov	Russia	195.96	1	73.71	1	122.25
2	Kseniia Akhanteva / Valerii Kolesov	Russia	174.85	2	70.44	2	104.41
3	Iuliia Artemeva / Mikhail Nazarychev	Russia	171.18	3	70.26	4	100.92
4	Annika Hocke / Robert Kunkel	Germany	167.15	4	63.57	3	103.58
5	Cléo Hamon / Denys Strekalin	France	156.35	6	58.23	5	98.12
6	Kate Finster / Balazs Nagy	United States	156.26	5	58.33	7	97.93
7	Alina Butaeva / Luka Berulava	Georgia	153.17	7	55.96	8	97.21
8	Wang Yuchen / Huang Yihang	China	152.10	8	54.09	6	98.01
9	Wang Huidi / Jia Ziqi	China	148.87	9	54.08	9	94.79
10	Anastasiia Smirnova / Danil Siianytsia	United States	145.05	11	51.19	10	93.86
11	Patricia Andrew / Zachary Daleman	Canada	134.98	14	46.84	11	88.14
12	Kateryna Dzitsiuk / Ivan Pavlov	Ukraine	132.96	13	47.45	12	85.51
13	Winter Deardorff / Mikhail Johnson	United States	131.53	10	53.77	15	77.76
14	Kelly-Ann Laurin / Loucas Éthier	Canada	131.01	12	47.77	13	83.24
15	Greta Crafoord / John Crafoord	Sweden	124.31	15	46.34	14	77.97
16	Alyssa Montan / Manuel Piazza	Italy	116.22	16	44.69	16	71.53

=== Ice dance ===
Rank	Name	Nation	Total points	RD		FD	
1	Avonley Nguyen / Vadym Kolesnik	United States	177.18	3	68.27	1	108.91
2	Maria Kazakova / Georgy Reviya	Georgia	176.19	2	69.98	2	106.21
3	Elizaveta Shanaeva / Devid Naryzhnyy	Russia	175.17	1	70.03	3	105.14
4	Arina Ushakova / Maxim Nekrasov	Russia	169.18	4	66.97	4	102.21
5	Diana Davis / Gleb Smolkin	Russia	165.22	5	66.53	5	98.69
6	Loïcia Demougeot / Théo Le Mercier	France	162.52	6	64.88	6	97.64
7	Katarina Wolfkostin / Jeffrey Chen	United States	159.20	7	64.77	7	94.43
8	Miku Makita / Tyler Gunara	Canada	153.20	10	60.87	10	92.33
9	Emmy Bronsard / Aissa Bouaraguia	Canada	153.16	8	61.98	11	91.18
10	Oona Brown / Gage Brown	United States	152.05	11	59.50	9	92.55
11	Natalie D'Alessandro / Bruce Waddell	Canada	151.79	9	61.63	12	90.16
12	Utana Yoshida / Shingo Nishiyama	Japan	149.61	13	56.05	8	93.56
13	Emily Rose Brown / James Hernandez	Great Britain	141.75	12	57.10	13	84.65
14	Maria Golubtsova / Kirill Belobrov	Ukraine	137.88	14	55.98	14	81.90
15	Lou Terreaux / Noé Perron	France	137.28	15	55.44	15	81.84
16	Natálie Taschlerová / Filip Taschler	Czech Republic	134.58	19	52.80	16	81.78
17	Carolina Portesi Peroni / Michael Chrastecky	Italy	133.05	16	54.42	18	78.63
18	Sofia Val / Linus Colmor Jepsen	Spain	130.61	20	51.18	17	79.43
19	Villő Marton / Danyil Semko	Hungary	130.49	17	53.03	19	77.46
20	Angelina Kudryavtseva / Ilia Karankevich	Cyprus	127.97	18	52.96	20	75.01
Did not advance to free dance
21	Lara Luft / Stephano Valentino Schuster	Germany	51.17	21	51.17	—N/a	
22	Anna Shnaider / Fedor Varlamov	Kazakhstan	47.21	22	47.21	—N/a	
23	Mariia Nosovitskaya / Mikhail Nosovitskiy	Israel	46.03	23	46.03	—N/a	
24	Yulia Alieva / Artur Biktimirov	Azerbaijan	45.96	24	45.96	—N/a	
25	Darja Netjaga / Marko Jevgeni Gaidajenko	Estonia	45.79	25	45.79	—N/a	
26	Oliwia Borowska / Filip Bojanowski	Poland	41.94	26	41.94	—N/a	
27	Karina Sidarenka / Maksim Yalenich	Belarus	40.94	27	40.94	—N/a	
28	Sara Buch-Weeke / Nicolas Woodcock	Denmark	39.59	28	39.59	—N/a	
29	Gina Zehnder / Beda Leon Sieber	Switzerland	31.99	29	31.99	—N/a	
