= Carolina Portesi Peroni =

Italian ice dancer

Personal information
- Other names: Carolina Peroni
- Born: 11 May 2001 (age 25) Brescia, Italy
- Home town: Bedizzole, Italy
- Height: 1.70 m (5 ft 7 in)

Figure skating career
- Country: Italy
- Partner: Pietro Papetti (since 2026); Michael Chrastecky (2017–23); Alessio Galli (2014–16)
- Coach: Barbara Fusar-Poli; Roberto Pelizzola; Federica Bernardi
- Skating club: Icelab Milano
- Began skating: 2008

Medal record
Italian Championships
Bronze medal – third place	2023 Brunico	Ice dance

Carolina Portesi Peroni (born 11 May 2001) is an Italian ice dancer. With her former skating partner, Michael Chrastecky, she is the 2023 Italian national bronze medalist, a two-time Italian junior national champion (2020–21) and competed in the final segment at the 2020 World Junior Championships.

== Personal life ==
Portesi Peroni was born on 11 May 2001, in Brescia, Italy, to Michela Peroni and Nicola Portesi. She has an older sister named Camilla.

== Career ==
=== Early career ===
Portesi Peroni competed for two seasons with Alessio Galli before forming a partnership with Czech-Slovene dancer Michael Chrastecky to represent her country.

Portesi Peroni/Chrastecky made their Junior Grand Prix debut at the 2017 JGP Italy, where they placed tenth. They did not return to the Junior Grand Prix the following season, competing instead at several minor, junior internationals and winning the bronze medal at the Italian championships.

=== 2019–20 season ===
Returning to the Junior Grand Prix, Portesi Peroni/Chrastecky placed seventh at 2019 JGP France and ninth at 2019 JGP Croatia. They won a bronze medal at the junior competition at Golden Spin and then took the gold at the Italian junior nationals for the first time. They concluded the season making their debut at the World Junior Championships, where they finished in seventeenth position.

=== 2020–21 season ===
With the coronavirus pandemic causing the cancellation of the international junior season, Portesi Peroni/Chrastecky won their second consecutive Italian junior title.

=== 2021–22 season ===
Making their international senior debut on the Challenger series, Portesi Peroni/Chrastecky placed eleventh on the 2021 CS Lombardia Trophy. They next competed at the 2021 CS Nebelhorn Trophy, seeking to qualify a second spot for Italy at the 2022 Winter Olympics. They placed eighth, making Italy the third reserve.

On October 6, Portesi Peroni announced on her Instagram that she had ruptured her patellar tendon, requiring surgery and four months of recovery, ending their season.

They were named to the host spot at the 2021 Gran Premio d'Italia but later withdrew due to their injury.

== Programs ==
With Chrastecky

Season	Rhythm dance	Free dance
2021–2022	Blues: Mercy on Me by Christina Aguilera; Funk: Dynamite by BTS choreo. by Barbara Fusar Poli, Lukas Csolley, Corrado Giordani	Lux Aeterna (from Requiem for a Dream); La terre vue du ciel by Armand Amar choreo. by Barbara Fusar Poli, Lukas Csolley, Corrado Giordani
2019–2020	Waltz: Ouverture; Quickstep: George Valentin; Slow fox: Pennies from Heaven; Swing: Peppy and George (from The Artist) by Ludovic Bource choreo. by Corrado Giordani	Io ci sarò by Andrea Bocelli choreo. by Corrado Giordani
2017–2018	Samba: Vocalizado; Cha cha: Sway by Pablo Beltrán Ruiz performed by Michael Bublé; Rhumba: Lunas Rotas by Rosana Arbelo; Samba: Batucada Brasileira choreo. by Corrado Giordani	Swan Lake by Pyotr Ilyich Tchaikovsky choreo. by Corrado Giordani

== Competitive highlights ==
GP: Grand Prix; CS: Challenger Series; JGP: Junior Grand Prix

=== Ice dance with Pietro Pappetti ===
Competition placements at senior level
Season	2026–27
CS Nebelhorn Trophy	9th
Iceskatera	1st
Mezzaluna Cup	3rd
NRW Trophy	3rd

=== With Michael Chrastecky ===
International
Event	16–17	17–18	18–19	19–20	20–21	21–22	22–23
GP Italy						WD	
CS Budapest							8th
CS Lombardia						11th	WD
CS Nebelhorn						8th	
CS Nepela Memorial							7th
Pavel Roman Memorial							2nd
International: Junior
Junior Worlds				17th			
JGP Croatia				9th			
JGP France				7th			
JGP Italy		10th					
Bosphorus Cup			2nd				
Egna Trophy			5th				
Golden Spin			5th	3rd			
Halloween Cup			WD	4th			
Volvo Open Cup			17th				
National
Italian Champ.	2nd J		3rd J	1st J	1st J		3rd
Levels: J = Junior; TBD = Assigned; WD = Withdrew

=== With Alessio Galli ===
International: Junior
Event	14–15	15–16
Bavarian Open	13th	10th
Santa Claus Cup		11th
Tallinn Trophy		15th
National
Italian Champ.	4th J	3rd J
Levels: J = Junior

== Detailed results ==
ISU Personal best highlighted in bold.

=== Ice dance with Pietro Papetti ===
Results in the 2026–27 season
Date	Event	RD		FD		Total	
Date	Event	P	Score	P	Score	P	Score
Sep 24–26, 2026	(Germany) 2026 CS Nebelhorn Trophy	11	55.10	8	92.90	9	148.00
Oct 23–25, 2026	(Italy) 2026 Mezzaluna Cup	4	7.053	3	101.57	3	172.10
Nov 6–7, 2026	(Poland) 2026 Iceskatera	1	69.30	3	99.21	1	168.51
Nov 12–15, 2026	(Germany) 2026 NRW Trophy	3	59.95	3	90.90	3	150.85

=== Senior-level results ===
2021–22 season
Date	Event	RD	FD	Total
22–25 September 2021	2021 CS Nebelhorn Trophy	TBD	TBD	TBD
9–12 September 2021	2021 CS Lombardia Trophy	12; **60.94**	10; **92.13**	11; **153.07**

=== Junior-level results ===
2020–21 season
Date	Event	RD	FD	Total
12–13 December 2020	2021 Italian Junior Championships	1; 61.42	1; 90.94	1; 152.36
2019–20 season
Date	Event	RD	FD	Total
2–8 March 2020	2020 World Junior Championships	16; 54.42	18; 78.63	17; 133.05
12–15 December 2019	2020 Italian Junior Championships	2; 55.65	1; 90.85	1; 146.50
4–7 December 2019	2019 Golden Spin of Zagreb	3; 61.79	4; 89.88	3; 151.67
17–20 October 2019	2019 Halloween Cup	4; 53.70	8; 77.62	4; 131.32
25–28 September 2019	2019 JGP Croatia	10; 52.87	7; 85.77	9; 138.64
21–24 August 2019	2019 JGP France	8; 53.60	7; 85.21	7; 138.81
2018–19 season
Date	Event	RD	FD	Total
1–3 February 2019	2019 Egna Dance Trophy	5; 52.96	6; 78.11	5; 131.07
13–16 December 2018	2019 Italian Junior Championships	3; 53.52	3; 76.95	3; 130.47
5–8 December 2018	2018 Golden Spin of Zagreb	5; 48.53	5; 73.04	5; 121.57
27 Nov. – 1 Dec. 2018	2018 Bosphorus Cup	2; 56.03	2; 77.27	2; 133.30
6–11 November 2018	2018 Volvo Open Cup	18; 40.55	15; 68.77	17; 109.32
19–21 October 2018	2018 Halloween Cup	8; 44.60	WD	WD
2017–18 season
Date	Event	SD	FD	Total
11–14 October 2017	2017 JGP Italy	11; 45.20	11; 61.87	10; 107.07
