= Danijil Szemko =

Ukrainian-Hungarian ice dancer

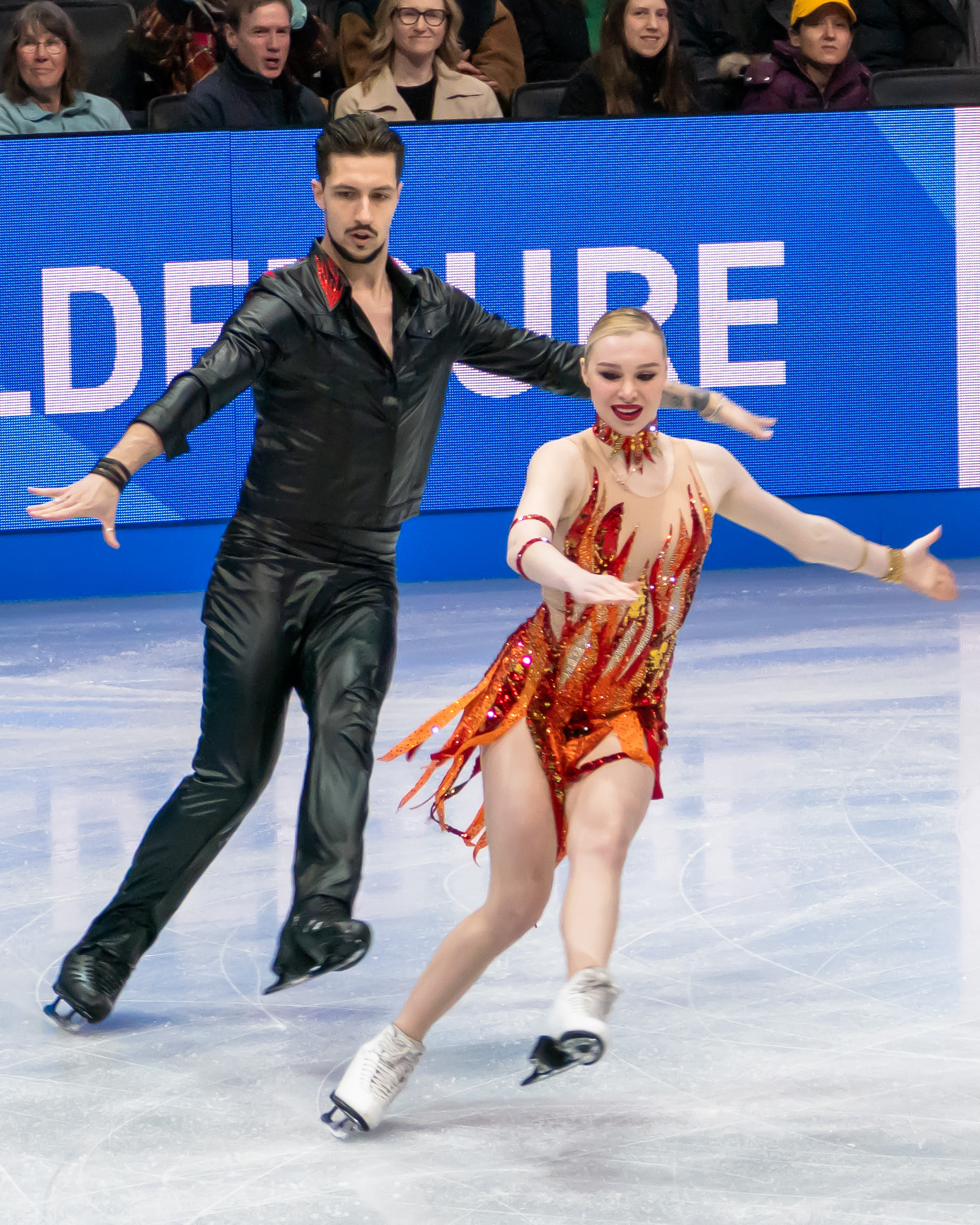
- Ignateva and Szemko at the 2025 World Championships

Personal information
- Native name: Даниїл Леонідович Семко (Ukrainian)
- Full name: Danijil Leonyidovics Szemko
- Other names: Szemkő Dániel; HUNDOG; L.S.D.
- Born: 17 May 2000 (age 26) Odesa, Ukraine
- Home town: Budapest, Hungary
- Height: 1.92 m (6 ft 3 1/2 in)

Figure skating career
- Country: Hungary
- Partner: Mariia Ignateva (since 2021); Villő Marton (2015–20)
- Coach: Barbara Fusar-Poli; Roberto Pelizzola; Lukáš Csölley
- Skating club: Hoffmann Figure Skating Academy
- Began skating: 2006

Danijil Leonyidovics Szemko (Ukrainian: Даниїл Леонідович Семко; born 17 May 2000) is a Hungarian ice dancer. With his skating partner, Mariia Ignateva, he is a five-time Hungarian national champions (2022–26), three-time Four Nationals medalists, the 2022 CS Denis Ten Memorial Challenge bronze medalist, 2022 Jégvirág Cup champion, the 2021 Volvo Open Cup silver medalist, and a two-time Santa Claus Cup silver medalist (2022–23).

With his former skating partner, Villő Marton, he is a three-time Hungarian junior national champion (2018–20) and competed in the final segment at two World Junior Championships (2018, 2020).

== Personal life ==
Szemko was born on 17 May 2000 in Odesa, Ukraine. He moved to Hungary in 2014 and became a Hungarian citizen in 2017. In 2021, he graduated from the National University of Ukraine on Physical Education and Sport and received the specialty of a coach in figure skating.

Danijil is interested in music, theater, and clowning art. He plays the guitar and harmonica, writes songs, and performs in musical groups of Budapest.

== Career ==
=== Early career ===
Szemko began skating in 2006. He previously competed with Yana Bardadym and Vera Gorodetskaia for his native Ukraine. Szemko teamed up with Villő Marton to represent Hungary in the 2015–16 season.

=== Partnership with Marton ===
==== 2015–2016 season: Debut of Marton/Szemko ====
Marton/Szemko made their international debut on the Junior Grand Prix series, finishing fifteenth in Latvia and eleventh in Croatia. They then finished thirteenth at the NRW Trophy and seventeenth at the Santa Claus Cup. At the 2016 Four National Championships, Marton/Szemko finished fifth overall and won the Hungarian junior silver medal behind Kimberly Wei and Illias Fourati. As a result, they were assigned to the 2016 World Junior Championships, where they finished twenty-third and did not qualify for the free dance.

==== 2016–2017 season ====
Marton/Szemko opened the season with a thirteenth-place finish at 2016 JGP France. They then finished twelfth at the NRW Trophy and seventh at the Open d'Andorra. An injury prevented the team from competing at Four National Championships and, therefore, from earning the 2017 World Junior Championships spot. Marton/Szemko recovered to win their first international medal at the 2017 Jégvirág Cup, earning silver behind Ukraine's Popova/Byelikov and ahead of Damulevičiūtė/Kizala of Lithuania. They ended their season with an eleventh-place finish at Bavarian Open.

==== 2017–2018 season: First Hungarian junior national title ====
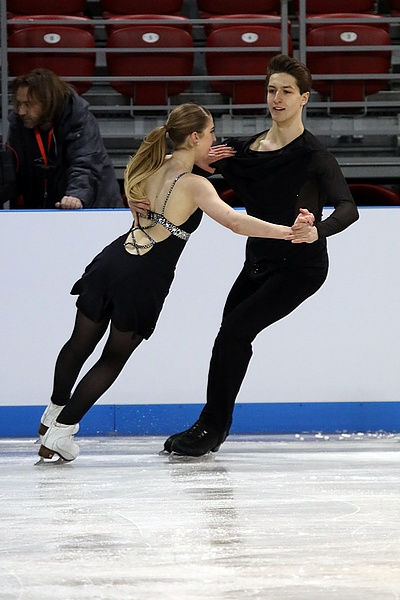
Marton/Szemko at the 2018 World Junior Championships

Marton/Szemko began the season with a fifteenth-place finish at JGP Austria and a ninth-place finish at JGP Croatia. They medaled at all but one of the events they competed at before the 2018 World Junior Championships, earning golds at the 2017 Halloween Cup and 2018 Jégvirág Cup, bronzes at the 2017 Leo Scheu Memorial and 2017 Open d'Andorra, and a ninth-place finish at the 2017 Santa Claus Cup.

Marton/Szemko won the 2018 Four National Championships ahead of the Czech Republic's Taschlerová/Taschler and Poland's Borysova/Zawadzki to earn their first junior national title. At the World Junior Championships, they were fifteenth in the short dance and twelfth in the free to finish fourteenth overall.

==== 2018–2019 season ====
Marton/Szemko started with a twelfth-place finish at JGP Slovenia and a thirteenth-place finish at JGP Armenia. The team finished tenth at Volvo Open Cup and earned silver at the Christmas Cup. Marton/Szemko won silver at the 2019 Four National Championships behind Taschlerová/Taschler but retained their Hungarian junior national title for a second consecutive season. At the 2019 World Junior Championships, they were twenty-third in the rhythm dance and did not advance to the free dance.

==== 2019–2020 season: End of Marton/Szemko ====
Marton/Szemko opened the season with an eighth-place finish at JGP France and a fifteenth-place finish at JGP Croatia. They earned bronze at Open d'Andorra and finished fifth at Santa Claus Cup. Marton/Szemko again won silver behind Taschlerová/Taschler at the 2020 Four National Championships while retaining their Hungarian junior national title. The team finished eighth at 2020 Mentor Toruń Cup. At the 2020 World Junior Championships, Marton/Szemko were seventeenth in the rhythm dance but fell to nineteenth in the free dance and remained nineteenth overall.

=== Partnership with Ignateva ===
Marton/Szemko split prior to the 2020–21 season. In January 2021, coach Nóra Hoffmann announced Szemko's partnership with Russian Mariia Ignateva to compete for Hungary. It was subsequently announced that the team would split their time between training in Budapest under Hoffmann and in Moscow under Irina Zhuk and Alexander Svinin.

==== 2021–2022 season: Debut of Ignateva/Szemko ====
Ignateva/Szemko made their international competitive debut at the 2021 CS Lombardia Trophy, where they placed seventeenth. They were then sixth at the Budapest Trophy before winning silver medals at the Volvo Open Cup and the Santa Claus Cup. At the 2022 Four National Championships, Ignateva/Szemko earned the bronze medal behind Poland's Kaliszek/Spodyriev and Taschlerová/Taschler of the Czech Republic, as well as the Hungarian national title. They were assigned to the 2022 European Championships, where they finished eighteenth overall. Ignateva/Szemko competed at the Jégvirág Cup in February and won their first international title together. They finished the season making the World Championship debut, finishing twenty-second.

==== 2022–2023 season: Challenger Series bronze ====
Beginning the season on the Challenger circuit, Ignateva/Szemko were eighth at the 2022 CS Nepela Memorial and seventh at the 2022 CS Budapest Trophy. They won the bronze medal at the 2022 CS Denis Ten Memorial Challenge, their first Challenger medal, and then repeated as silver medalists at the Santa Claus Cup. They finished second in the standings at the 2023 Four National Championships, behind only Czechs Taschlerová/Taschler, thus winning the Hungarian national title for a second consecutive year.

Ignateva/Szemko finished tenth at the 2023 European Championships, and then twentieth at the 2023 World Championships.

Following the season, the team relocated to Milan, Italy, where Barbara Fusar-Poli became their head coach.

==== 2023–2024 season: Grand Prix debut ====
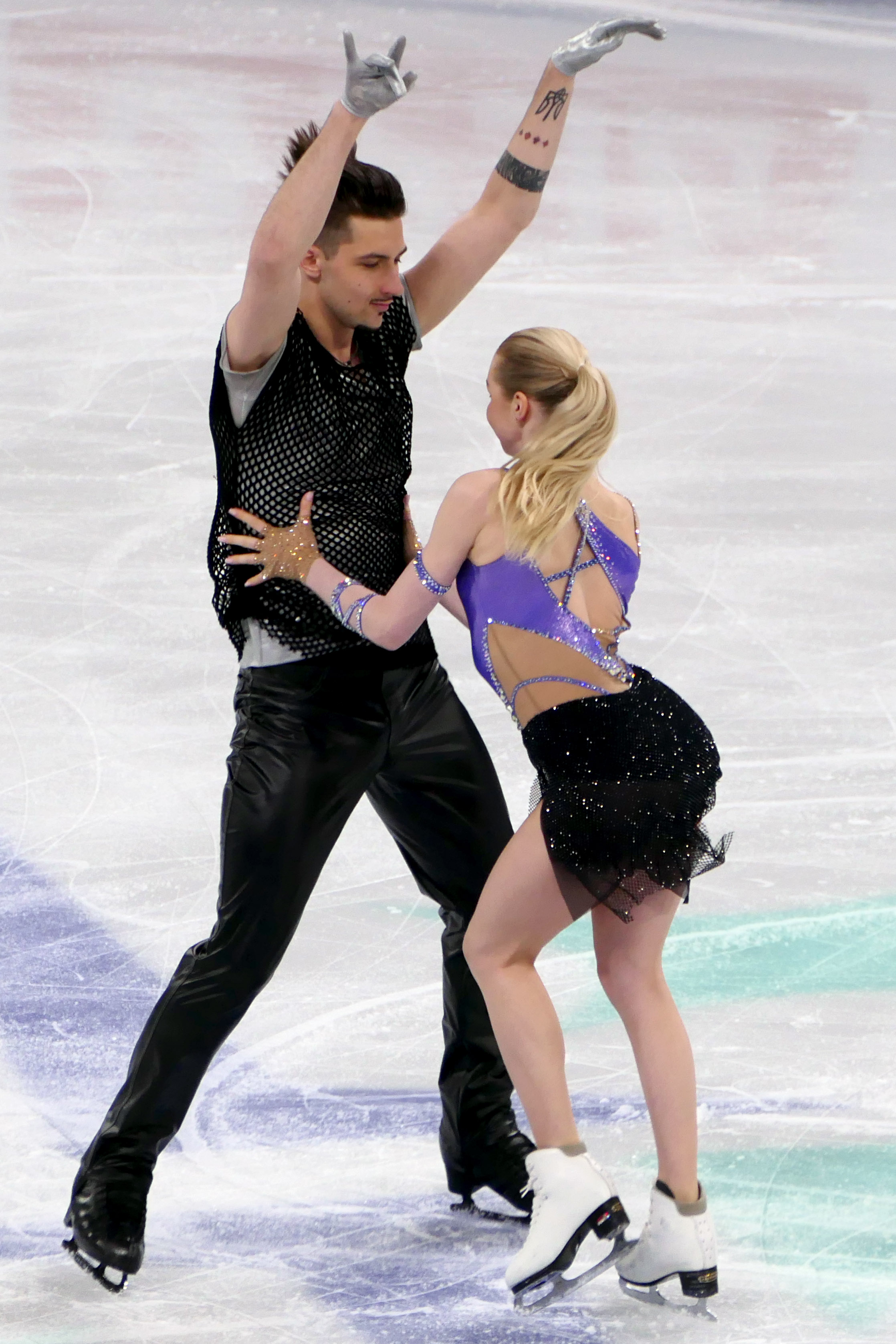
Ignateva/Szemko following their rhythm dance at the 2024 World Championships

Ignateva/Szemko appeared at two Challenger events, coming ninth at the 2023 CS Budapest Trophy and eighth at the 2023 CS Denis Ten Memorial Challenge. They were invited to make their Grand Prix debut at the 2023 Grand Prix of Espoo, where they finished tenth.

After retaining the Hungarian national title, Ignateva/Szemko were fourth at both the Bosphorus Cup and the International Challenge Cup. They were twenty-fifth at the 2024 European Championships and twenty-fourth at the 2024 World Championships.

==== 2024–2025 season ====
Ignateva/Szemko started the season by competing on the 2024–25 ISU Challenger Series, finishing sixth at the 2024 CS Lombardia Trophy and fifth at the 2024 CS Budapest Trophy. They then went on to win gold at the 2024 Mezzaluna Cup and bronze at the 2024 Santa Claus Cup.

In December, Ignateva/Szemko competed at the 2025 Four National Championships, where they finished in fourth place. They followed this up with a silver medal win at the 2025 Ephesus Cup. Selected to compete at the 2025 European Championships in Tallinn, Estonia, Ignateva/Szemko finished the event in fourteenth place.

The team then went on to finish fourth at the Road to 26 Trophy, a test event for the 2026 Winter Olympics. They subsequently closed the season with a twenty-fourth-place finish at the 2025 World Championships in Boston, Massachusetts, United States.

==== 2025–26 season ====
Ignateva/Szemko opened their season by finishing sixth at the 2025 CS Lombardia Trophy. They then went on to compete at the final Olympic qualifying event, the 2025 Skate to Milano. Ignateva/Szemko finished sixth overall and were named as the second alternates for the 2026 Winter Olympic ice dance team.

They subsequently won silver at the 2025 Budapest Trophy. In November, Ignateva/Szemko won bronze at the 2025 NRW Trophy, finished fourteenth at the 2025 CS Warsaw Cup, and won the silver medal at the 2025 Santa Claus Cup. The following month, they won the bronze medal at the 2026 Four National Championships.

In January, Ignateva/Szemko competed at the 2026 European Championships in Sheffield, England, United Kingdom, finishing in fifteenth place overall.

== Programs ==
=== With Ignateva ===
Season	Rhythm dance	Free dance
2025–2026	Be My Lover by La Bouche; Mr. Boombastic by Shaggy; Here Comes the Hotstepper by Ini Kamoze	Lure by Christian Reindl & Dream Harlowe; Tick Tock Goes The Clock by Jo Blankenburg; The Joker and the Queen by Ed Sheeran & Taylor Swift; Rock and Roll Part II by Gary Glitter
2024–2025	Trouble (from Elvis) performed by Austin Butler; Fever; Blue Suede Shoes by Elvis Presley	Lure by Christian Reindl & Dream Harlowe; Tick Tock Goes The Clock by Jo Blankenburg; The Joker and the Queen by Ed Sheeran & Taylor Swift; Rock and Roll Part II by Gary Glitter
2023–2024	Boys (Summertime Love) by Sabrina Salerno; Total Eclipse of the Heart by Bonnie Tyler; Push It by Salt-N-Pepa choreo. by Irina Zhuk	Slip by Elliot Moss; Dark Side by Bishop Briggs choreo. by Irina Zhuk
2022–2023	Mil Pasos by Soha; Sympathy for the Devil by The Rolling Stones choreo. by Maxim Staviski	Cirque du Soleil choreo. by Maxim Staviski
2021–2022	Selection by Two Feet choreo. by Maxim Staviski	Maybe I Maybe You by Scorpions choreo. by Maxim Staviski

=== With Marton ===
Season	Rhythm dance	Free dance
2019–2020	Blues: Gee, Baby, Ain't I Good to You performed by Susan Boyd; Foxtrot: This Business of Love by Domino; Swing: Hey! Pachuco! performed by Royal Crown Revue (from The Mask) choreo. by Svetlana Liapina, Ksenia Monko	Come Together performed by Petra Magoni, Ferruccio Spinetti; Highway to Hell by AC/DC; Walk This Way by Aerosmith choreo. by Svetlana Liapina, Ksenia Monko
2018–2019	Tango: Tango in the Sky by Peter Dranga choreo. by Irina Zhuk, Ilona Berecz	Black Cat, White Cat by Goran Bregović choreo. by Tibor Dalotti, Ilona Berecz
	Short dance	
2017–2018	Rhumba: Set Fire to the Rain by Adele; Cha-cha: Kiss performed by Tom Jones choreo. by Ilona Berecz	Dark Waltz by Hayley Westenra; Experience by Ludovico Einaudi choreo. by Ilona Berecz
2016–2017	Blues: Black Velvet performed by Alannah Miles; Swing: Booty Swing by Parov Stelar choreo. by Benoît Richaud	Dracula choreo. by Benoît Richaud
2015–2016	Waltz: Chim Chim Cher-ee; Polka: Supercalifragilisticexpialidocious (from Mary Poppins) by Sherman Brothers choreo. by Ilona Berecz	Alegría; Querer (from Cirque du Soleil) by René Dupéré choreo. by Ilona Berecz

== Competitive highlights ==
- GP – Event of the ISU Grand Prix Series
- CS – Event of the ISU Challenger Series
- TBD – Assigned
- WD – Withdrew from competition

=== Ice dance with Mariia Ignateva ===
Competition placements at senior level
Season	2021–22	2022–23	2023–24	2024–25	2025–26	2026–27
World Championships	22nd	20th	24th	24th	21st	
European Championships	18th	10th	25th	14th	15th	
Hungarian Championships	1st	1st	1st	1st		
GP Finland			10th			
CS Budapest Trophy	6th	7th	9th			
CS Denis Ten Memorial		3rd	8th			
CS Lombardia Trophy	17th			6th	6th	
CS Nepela Memorial		8th				
CS Warsaw Cup					14th	
CS Trialeti Trophy						3rd
Budapest Trophy					2nd	
Challenge Cup	3rd		4th			
Denkova-Staviski Cup						4th
Jégvirág Cup	1st					
Mezzaluna Cup				1st		
NRW Trophy					3rd	
Road to 26 Trophy				4th		
Santa Claus Cup	2nd	2nd		3rd	2nd	
Skate to Milano					6th	
Volvo Open Cup	2nd					
Bosphorus Cup			4th			

=== Ice dance with Villö Marton ===
International: Junior
Event	15–16	16–17	17–18	18–19	19–20
Junior Worlds	23rd		14th	23rd	19th
JGP Armenia				13th	
JGP Austria			15th		
JGP Croatia	11th		9th		15th
JGP France		13th			8th
JGP Latvia	15th				
JGP Slovenia				12th	
Bavarian Open		11th		11th	
Christmas Cup				2nd	
Halloween Cup			1st		
Jégvirág Cup		2nd	1st		
Leo Scheu			3rd		
Mentor Toruń Cup					8th
NRW Trophy	13th	12th			
Open d'Andorra		7th	3rd		3rd
Santa Claus Cup	17th	WD	9th		5th
Volvo Open Cup				10th	
National
Hungarian Champ.	2nd J		1st J	1st J	1st J

== Detailed results ==
=== Ice dance with Mariia Ignateva ===
ISU personal best scores in the +5/-5 GOE System
Segment	Type	Score	Event
Total	TSS	174.95	2024 CS Budapest Trophy
Short program	TSS	71.75	2024 CS Budapest Trophy
Short program	TES	43.01	2022 CS Denis Ten Memorial Challenge
Short program	PCS	30.58	2024 CS Budapest Trophy
Free skating	TSS	105.70	2025 European Championships
Free skating	TES	61.53	2022 CS Denis Ten Memorial Challenge
Free skating	PCS	45.80	2024 CS Budapest Trophy

Results in the 2021–22 season
Date	Event	RD		FD		Total	
Date	Event	P	Score	P	Score	P	Score
Sep 10–12, 2021	(Italy) 2021 CS Lombardia Trophy	18	51.96	17	77.95	17	129.91
Oct 14–17, 2021	(Hungary) 2021 Budapest Trophy	7	60.76	6	89.62	6	150.68
Nov 3–7, 2021	(Latvia) 2021 Volvo Open Cup	2	63.91	2	95.58	2	159.49
Dec 6–12, 2021	(Hungary) 2021 Santa Claus Cup	2	71.05	2	106.76	2	177.81
Dec 16–18, 2021	(Slovakia) 2022 Four Nationals Championships	3	69.79	3	98.44	3	168.23
Dec 16–18, 2021	(Slovakia) 2022 Hungarian Championships (Note: The Hungarian Championships are contested as part of the Four Nationals Championships.)	1	—N/a	1	—N/a	1	—N/a
Jan 10–16, 2022	(Estonia) 2022 European Championships	19	60.41	18	90.42	18	150.83
Feb 11–13, 2022	(Hungary) 2022 Jégvirág Cup	1	66.97	1	90.50	1	157.47
Feb 24–27, 2022	(Netherlands) 2022 Challenge Cup	5	58.64	3	94.43	3	153.07
Mar 21–27, 2022	(France) 2022 World Championships	22	62.12	—N/a	—N/a	22	62.12

Results in the 2022–23 season
Date	Event	RD		FD		Total	
Date	Event	P	Score	P	Score	P	Score
Sep 29 – Oct 1, 2022	(Slovakia) 2022 CS Nepela Memorial	9	56.87	8	90.52	8	147.39
Oct 13–16, 2022	(Hungary) 2022 CS Budapest Trophy	9	56.07	7	94.47	7	150.54
Oct 26–29, 2022	(Kazakhstan) 2022 CS Denis Ten Memorial Challenge	3	70.20	3	104.03	3	174.23
Nov 28 – Dec 4, 2022	(Hungary) 2021 Santa Claus Cup	2	68.55	2	107.84	2	176.39
Dec 16–18, 2022	(Hungary) 2023 Four Nationals Championships	2	67.07	2	103.98	2	171.05
Dec 16–18, 2022	(Hungary) 2023 Hungarian Championships	1	—N/a	1	—N/a	1	—N/a
Jan 23–29, 2023	(Finland) 2023 European Championships	10	65.04	9	102.04	10	167.08
Mar 20–26, 2023	(Japan) 2023 World Championships	20	63.88	20	93.63	20	157.51

Results in the 2023–24 season
Date	Event	RD		FD		Total	
Date	Event	P	Score	P	Score	P	Score
Oct 13–15, 2023	(Hungary) 2023 CS Budapest Trophy	11	57.45	8	95.51	9	152.96
Nov 2–5, 2023	(Kazakhstan) 2023 CS Denis Ten Memorial Challenge	8	59.53	7	87.63	8	147.16
Nov 17–19, 2023	(Finland) 2023 Grand Prix of Espoo	10	57.57	10	89.83	10	147.40
Nov 27 – Dec 3, 2023	(Turkey) 2023 Bosphorus Cup	4	65.91	4	106.31	4	172.22
Dec 14–16, 2023	(Czech Republic) 2024 Four Nationals Championships	2	65.58	4	96.74	4	162.32
Dec 14–16, 2023	(Czech Republic) 2024 Hungarian Championships	1	—N/a	1	—N/a	1	—N/a
Jan 8–14, 2024	(Lithuania) 2024 European Championships	25	55.04	—N/a	—N/a	25	55.04
Feb 22–25, 2024	(Netherlands) 2024 Challenge Cup	4	67.30	4	101.56	4	168.86
Mar 18–24, 2024	(Canada) 2024 World Championships	24	64.59	—N/a	—N/a	24	64.59

Results in the 2024–25 season
Date	Event	RD		FD		Total	
Date	Event	P	Score	P	Score	P	Score
Sep 13–15, 2024	(Italy) 2024 CS Lombardia Trophy	7	67.33	5	103.75	6	171.08
Oct 11–13, 2024	(Hungary) 2024 CS Budapest Trophy	4	71.75	6	103.20	5	174.95
Oct 25–27, 2024	(Italy) 2024 Mezzaluna Cup	2	68.93	1	113.95	1	182.88
Nov 27 – Dec 2, 2024	(Hungary) 2024 Bosphorus Cup	4	64.28	2	108.79	3	173.07
Dec 13–14, 2024	(Poland) 2025 Four Nationals Championships	3	67.85	4	106.65	4	174.50
Dec 13–14, 2024	(Poland) 2025 Hungarian Championships	1	—N/a	1	—N/a	1	—N/a
Jan 20–24, 2025	(Turkey) 2025 Ephesus Cup	2	67.48	2	104.34	2	171.82
Jan 28 – Feb 2, 2025	(Estonia) 2025 European Championships	14	67.10	14	105.70	14	172.80
Feb 19–20, 2025	(Italy) 2025 Road to 26 Trophy	4	68.89	4	103.64	4	172.53
Mar 25–30, 2025	(United States) 2025 World Championships	24	65.09	—N/a	—N/a	24	65.09

Results in the 2025–26 season
Date	Event	RD		FD		Total	
Date	Event	P	Score	P	Score	P	Score
Sep 11–14, 2025	(Italy) 2025 CS Lombardia Trophy	6	62.33	7	96.90	6	159.23
Sep 18–21, 2025	(China) 2025 ISU Skate to Milano	7	64.58	3	103.15	6	167.73
Oct 10–12, 2025	(Hungary) 2025 Budapest Trophy	2	73.14	2	111.98	2	185.12
Nov 13–16, 2025	(Germany) 2025 NRW Trophy	3	67.09	2	105.22	3	172.31
Nov 19–23, 2025	(Poland) 2025 CS Warsaw Cup	12	65.73	15	98.43	14	164.14
Nov 26–30, 2025	(Hungary) 2025 Santa Claus Cup	3	70.74	1	109.76	2	180.50
Dec 11–13, 2025	(Slovakia) 2026 Four Nationals Championships	3	72.49	3	107.28	3	179.77
Dec 11–13, 2025	(Slovakia) 2026 Hungarian Championships	1	—N/a	1	—N/a	1	—N/a
Jan 13–18, 2026	(United Kingdom) 2026 European Championships	14	67.74	15	103.89	15	171.63
Mar 24–29, 2026	(Czech Republic) 2026 World Championships	21	68.71	—N/a	—N/a	21	68.71

Results in the 2026–27 season
Date	Event	RD		FD		Total	
Date	Event	P	Score	P	Score	P	Score
Oct 1–4, 2026	(Georgia (country)) 2026 CS Trialeti Trophy	3	69.80	7	95.92	3	165.72
Nov 6–8, 2026	(Bulgaria) 2026 Denkova-Staviski Cup	5	69.87	3	104.71	4	174.58
