= Santa Claus Cup =

Annual figure skating competition

The Santa Claus Cup is an annual international figure skating competition which is generally held in late November or early December in Budapest, Hungary. It is organized by the Hungarian National Skating Federation. Medals may be awarded in men's singles, women’s singles, and ice dance at the senior, junior, and novice levels.

== Senior results ==
=== Men's singles ===
Year	Gold	Silver	Bronze	Results
2014	(Spain) Javier Raya	(Spain) Felipe Montoya	(Austria) Manuel Koll	
2015	(Spain) Felipe Montoya	(Austria) Mario-Rafael Ionian	(Azerbaijan) Larry Loupolover	
2016	(Georgia (country)) Morisi Kvitelashvili	(Georgia (country)) Irakli Maysuradze	(Spain) Felipe Montoya	
2017	(Russia) Konstantin Milyukov	(Italy) Maurizio Zandron	(France) Philip Warren	
2019	(France) Luc Economides	(Austria) Maurizio Zandron	(France) Philip Warren	
2020	(Hungary) András Csernoch	(Czech Republic) Jiří Bělohradský	(Spain) Iker Oyarzábal	
2021	(Italy) Nikolaj Memola	(Russia) Artem Kovalev	(Slovakia) Adam Hagara	
2022	(Monaco) Davide Lewton Brain	(Slovakia) Adam Hagara	(Hungary) Aleksandr Vlasenko	
2024	(Chinese Taipei) Li Yu-Hsiang	(Monaco) Davide Lewton Brain	(Hungary) Aleksandr Vlasenko	
2025	(Chinese Taipei) Li Yu-Hsiang	(Germany) Arthur Wolfgang Mai	(Slovenia) David Sedej	

=== Women's singles ===
Year	Gold	Silver	Bronze	Results
2014	(Hungary) Ivett Tóth	(Italy) Giada Russo	(Romania) Julia Sauter	
2015	(Czech Republic) Eliška Březinová	(Hungary) Ivett Tóth	(Luxembourg) Fleur Maxwell	
2016	(Hungary) Ivett Tóth	(Brazil) Isadora Williams	(Romania) Julia Sauter	
2017	(Hungary) Ivett Tóth	(Belgium) Loena Hendrickx	(Italy) Micol Cristini	
2019	(Armenia) Anastasia Galustyan	(Hungary) Júlia Láng	(Austria) Sophia Schaller	
2020	(Hungary) Júlia Láng	(Cyprus) Emilea Zingas	(Hungary) Ivett Tóth	
2021	(Azerbaijan) Ekaterina Ryabova	(Hungary) Regina Schermann	(Hungary) Júlia Láng	
2022	(Norway) Mia Caroline Risa Gomez	(Israel) Mariia Seniuk	(Estonia) Kristina Škuleta-Gromova	
2024	(United States) Starr Andrews	(Netherlands) Niki Wories	(United States) Sonja Hilmer	
2025	(Mexico) Andrea Montesinos Cantu	(United States) Kendall Erne	(Switzerland) Sara Franzi	

=== Ice dance ===
Year	Gold	Silver	Bronze	Results
2014	(Poland) Natalia Kaliszek / Maksym Spodyriev	(Turkey) Alisa Agafonova / Alper Ucar	(Italy) Misato Komatsubara / Andrea Fabbri	
2015	(Russia) Tiffany Zahorski / Jonathan Guerreiro	(Italy) Misato Komatsubara / Andrea Fabbri	(Ukraine) Valeria Haistruk / Oleksiy Oliynyk	
2016	(Spain) Sara Hurtado / Kirill Khaliavin	(United Kingdom) Lilah Fear / Lewis Gibson	(Switzerland) Victoria Manni / Carlo Röthlisberger	
2017	(Ukraine) Oleksandra Nazarova / Maxim Nikitin	(Hungary) Anna Yanovskaya / Ádám Lukács	(Poland) Natalia Kaliszek / Maksym Spodyriev	
2019	(Russia) Anastasia Skoptsova / Kirill Aleshin	(Armenia) Tina Garabedian/ Simon Proulx-Sénécal	(Finland) Yuka Orihara / Juho Pirinen	
2020	(Germany) Jennifer Janse van Rensburg / Benjamin Steffan	(Germany) Lara Luft / Maximilian Pfisterer	No other competitors	
2021	(Russia) Anastasia Skoptsova / Kirill Aleshin	(Hungary) Mariia Ignateva / Danijil Szemko	(Australia) Holly Harris / Jason Chan	
2022	(Australia) Holly Harris / Jason Chan	(Hungary) Mariia Ignateva / Danijil Szemko	(United States) Lorraine McNamara / Anton Spiridonov	
2024	(United States); Oona Brown; Gage Brown	(France); Natacha Lagouge; Arnaud Caffa	(Hungary); Mariia Ignateva; Danijil Leonyidovics Szemko	
2025	(United States); Emily Bratti; Ian Somerville	(Hungary); Mariia Ignateva; Danijil Leonyidovics Szemko	(United States); Elliana Peal; Ethan Peal	

== Junior results ==
=== Men's singles ===
Year	Gold	Silver	Bronze	Results
2009	(Hungary) Krisztián Andraska	No other competitors		
2010	(Romania) Vlad Ionescu	(Hungary) Kristóf Forgó	(United Kingdom) Jamie Wright	
2011	(United Kingdom) Jack Newberry	(Hungary) Kristóf Forgó	(Slovakia) Marco Klepoch	
2012	(Hungary) Kristóf Forgó	(United Kingdom) Charles Parry-Evans	(Italy) Antonio Panfili	
2013	(United Kingdom) Charles Parry-Evans	(Slovakia) Marco Klepoch	(Germany) Christopher Huettl	
2014	(Latvia) Deniss Vasiļjevs	(Spain) Hector Alonso Serrano	(Spain) Aleix Gabara Xanco	
2015	(Italy) Daniel Grassl	(Ukraine) Ivan Shmuratko	(Italy) Simone Cervi	
2016	(Italy) Daniel Grassl	(Georgia (country)) Nika Egadze	(Czech Republic) Matyáš Bělohradský	
2017	(Ukraine) Ivan Shmuratko	(Germany) Denis Gurdzhi	(Czech Republic) Daniel Mrazek	
2019	(Germany) Nikita Starostin	(Germany) Louis Weissert	(Germany) Linus Mager	
2020	(Hungary) Mozes József Berei	(Slovenia) David Sedej	No other competitors	
2021	(Hungary) Mozes József Berei	(Hungary) Aleksandr Vlasenko	(Armenia) Semen Daniliants	
2022	(Israel) Nikita Sheiko	(Slovakia) Lukas Vaclavik	(Estonia) Jegor Martsenko	
2023	(Israel) Tamir Kuperman	(Israel) Nikita Sheiko	(Belgium) Denis Krouglov	
2024	(Israel) Nikita Sheiko	(Belgium) Denis Krouglov	(Israel) Tamir Kuperman	
2025	(United States) Caleb Farrington	(United States) Ryan William Azadpour	(Austria) Maksym Petrychenko	

=== Women's singles ===
Year	Gold	Silver	Bronze	Results
2009	(Finland) Emilia Simonen	(Hungary) Regina Borbely	(Italy) Silvia Monti	
2010	(Finland) Noora Pitkanen	(Finland) Rosaliina Kuparinen	(Finland) Reetta Romppanen	
2011	(Italy) Elettra Olivotto	(Finland) Eveliina Viljanen	(Germany) Henriette Grassler	
2012	(Bulgaria) Anna Afonkina	(Hungary) Ivett Tóth	(Italy) Giada Russo	
2013	(Hungary) Ivett Tóth	(Italy) Chiara Calderone	(Hungary) Dorka Havasi	
2014	(Hungary) Fruzsina Medgyesi	(Hungary) Júlia Bátori	(Slovakia) Alexandra Hagarová	
2015	(Germany) Annika Hocke	(Denmark) Pernille Sørensen	(Finland) Petra Laakkonen	
2016	(Czech Republic) Dahyun Ko	(Austria) Sophia Schaller	(Israel) Paige Conners	
2017	(Russia) Valeriia Sidorova	(Czech Republic) Klara Stepanova	(Finland) Vera Stolt	
2019	(Hungary) Regina Schermann	(Netherlands) Lindsay Van Zundert	(Hungary) Lili Krizsanovszky	
2020	(Hungary) Lili Krizsanovszky	(Hungary) Bernadett Szigeti	(Hungary) Cintia Szabó	
2021	(Belgium) Nina Pinzarrone	(Switzerland) Kimmy Repond	(Russia) Anastasia Voronina	
2022	(Hungary) Polina Dzsumanyijazova	(Poland) Noelle Streuli	(Slovakia) Olivia Lengyelova	
2023	(Switzerland) Anastasia Brandenburg	(Czech Republic) Jana Horcickova	(Hungary) Polina Dzsumanyijazova	
2024	(United States) Logan Higase-Chen	(Israel) Sophia Shifrin	(Czech Republic) Jana Horcickova	
2025	(United States) Annika Chao	(United States) Jessica Jurka	(United States) Angela Shao	

=== Ice dance ===
Year	Gold	Silver	Bronze	Results
2009	(Hungary) Dóra Turóczi / Balázs Major	(Russia) Angelina Telegina / Valentin Molotov	(Uzbekistan) Maria Popkova / Viktor Kovalenko	
2010	(United Kingdom) Charlotte Aiken / Josh Whidborne	(Germany) Juliane Haslinger / Tom Finke	(Kazakhstan) Karina Uzurova / Ilias Ali	
2011	(Russia) Valeria Zenkova / Valerie Sinitsin	(France) Gabriella Papadakis / Guillaume Cizeron	(Ukraine) Daria Korotitskaya / Maksym Spodyriev	
2012	(Ukraine) Oleksandra Nazarova / Maxim Nikitin	(Italy) Sofia Sforza / Francesco Fioretti	(Russia) Kristina Baklanova / Andrei Bagin	
2013	(France) Angélique Abachkina / Louis Thauron	(France) Sarah-Marine Rouffanche / Geoffrey Brissaud	(Poland) Natalia Kaliszek / Yaroslav Kurbakov	
2014	(Hungary) Carolina Moscheni / Ádám Lukács	(Russia) Daria Rumiantseva / Dmitri Riabchenko	(Germany) Katharina Müller / Tim Dieck	
2015	(Italy) Sara Ghislandi / Giona Terzo Ortenzi	(Russia) Daria Rumiantseva / Dmitri Riabchenko	(Ukraine) Anzhelika Yurchenko / Volodymyr Byelikov	
2016	(Russia) Sophia Litvinova / Aleksandr Balikov	(Russia) Polina Ivanenko / Daniil Karpov	(United Kingdom) Sasha Fear / Elliot Verburg	
2017	(Russia) Elizaveta Shanaeva / Devid Naryzhnyy	(Ukraine) Mariia Holubtsova / Kyryl Bielobrov	(Georgia (country)) Maria Kazakova / Georgy Reviya	
2019	(Russia) Irina Khavronina / Dario Cirisano	(Russia) Angelina Zimina / Aleksandr Gnedin	(Russia) Ekaterina Rybakova / Ivan Makhnonosov	
2020	(France) Marie Dupayage / Thomas Nabais	(France) Louise Bordet / Thomas Gipoulou	(France) Célina Fradji / Jean-Hans Fourneaux	
2021	(Russia) Anna Kolomenskaia / Artem Frolov	(Ukraine) Mariia Pinchuk / Mykyta Pogorielov	(Russia) Aleksandra Prokopets / Vladislav Grishin	
2022	(Israel) Elizabeth Tkachenko / Alexei Kiliakov	(United States) Leah Neset / Artem Markelov	(Georgia (country)) Grace Elizabeth Vainik / Yehor Barshak	
2023	(France) Ambre Perrier Gianesini / Samuel Blanc Klaperman	(Finland) Hilda Taylor / Nolen Hickey	(France) Louise Duprat / Tahory Taddei-Dugue	
2024	(France); Ambre Perrier Gianesini; Samuel Blanc Klaperman	(United States); Hana Maria Aboian; Daniil Veselukhin	(France); Dania Mouaden; Théo Bigot	
2025	(United States); Jane Calhoun; Mark Zheltyshev	(Germany); Nelly Elisa Hemcke; Artyom Sladkov	(Ukraine); Tetiana Bielodonova; Ivan Kachur	
