= Juulia Turkkila =

Finnish figure skater (born 1994)

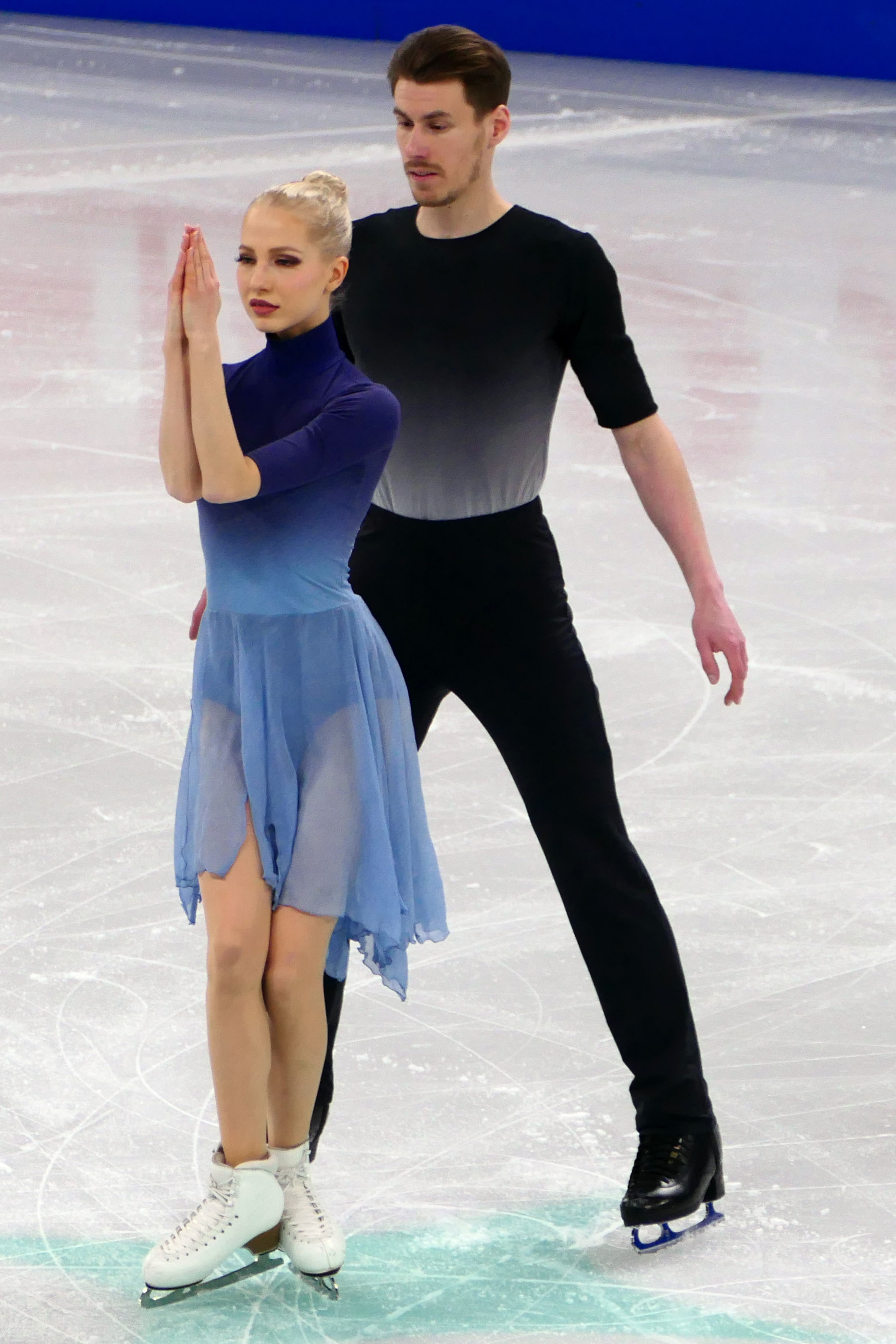
- Juulia Turkkila and Matthias Versluis at the 2024 World Championships

Personal information
- Born: 3 November 1994 (age 32) Helsinki, Finland
- Height: 1.64 m (5 ft 5 in)

Figure skating career
- Country: Finland
- Discipline: Ice dance (since 2016); Women's singles (2009–16)
- Partner: Matthias Versluis (since 2016)
- Coach: Maurizio Margaglio; Neil Brown
- Skating club: Helsingin Luistelijat
- Began skating: 2001
- Highest WS: 34th (2020–21)

Medal record
Event	Gold medal – first place	Silver medal – second place	Bronze medal – third place
European Championships	0	0	1
Finnish Championships	6	4	1
Medal list
European Championships
Bronze medal – third place	2023 Espoo	Ice dance
Finnish Championships
Gold medal – first place	2014 Espoo	Singles
Gold medal – first place	2019 Kouvola	Ice dance
Gold medal – first place	2022 Pori	Ice dance
Gold medal – first place	2023 Joensuu	Ice dance
Gold medal – first place	2024 Helsinki	Ice dance
Gold medal – first place	2025 Rauma	Ice dance
Gold medal – first place	2026 Lahti	Ice dance
Silver medal – second place	2012 Tampere	Singles
Silver medal – second place	2013 Joensuu	Singles
Silver medal – second place	2017 Tampere	Ice dance
Silver medal – second place	2018 Kouvola	Ice dance
Bronze medal – third place	2016 Mikkeli	Singles

Juulia Turkkila (Finnish pronunciation: [ˈjuːliɑ ˈturkkːilɑ]; born 3 November 1994) is a Finnish figure skater. Competing in ice dancing with Matthias Versluis, she competed at two Winter Olympics (2022, 2026), is the 2023 European bronze medalist, a four-time Grand Prix medalist, the 2023 CS Finlandia Trophy gold medalist, and a six-time Finnish national ice dancing champion (2019, 2022–26). Turkkila and Versluis also earned a bronze medal for the free dance segment at the 2025 European Championships.

As a single skater, she is the 2012 Nordic champion and 2014 Finnish national champion. She competed in the final segment at eight ISU Championships, achieving her best result, twelfth, at the 2014 Europeans.

== Personal life ==
Juulia Turkkila was born on 3 November 1994 in Helsinki, Finland. At age six, she began training in ballet at the Finnish National Opera and Ballet. After graduating from secondary school, she decided to study economics at Aalto University.

== Career ==
=== Competitive singles career ===
==== Early years ====
Turkkila began learning to skate in 2001. She made her junior international debut at the Nordic Championships in February 2010.

==== 2010–11 season: Senior international debut ====
Turkkila placed sixteenth at the 2011 World Junior Championships, fifteenth at the 2011 European Championships, and twentieth at the 2011 World Championships. She won the bronze medal at the 2011 Nordics.

==== 2011–12 season ====
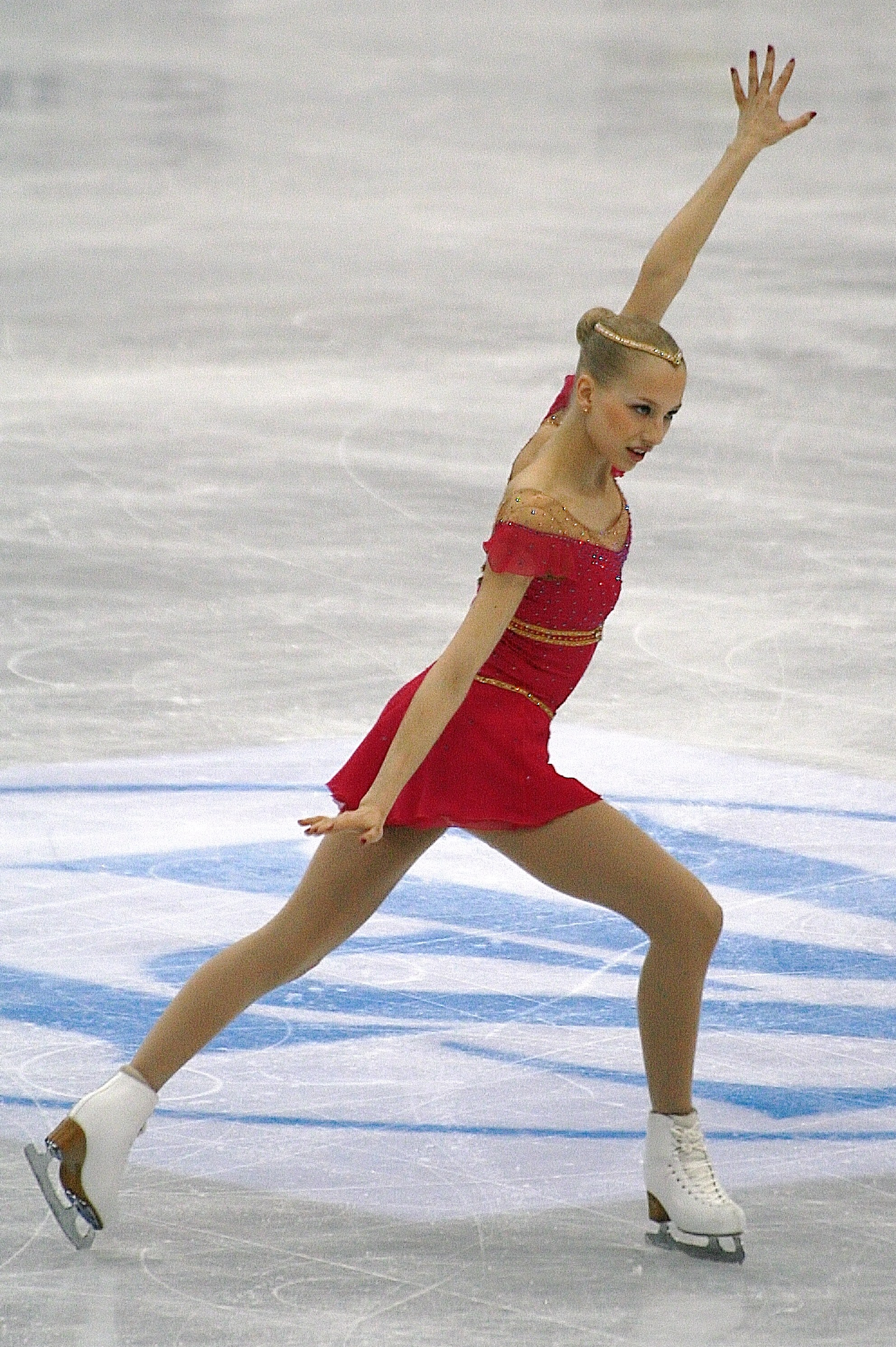
Turkkila at the 2012 World Championships

Turkkila won the silver medal at the 2012 Finnish Championships, behind Kiira Korpi. She placed seventeenth at the 2012 European Championships, nineteenth at the 2012 World Junior Championships, and eighteenth at the 2012 World Championships. She won the gold medal at the 2012 Nordics.

==== 2012–13 season ====
Turkkila placed sixth at the 2012 Finlandia Trophy and ninth at the 2012 Nebelhorn Trophy. She won the silver medal at the 2013 Finnish Championships, again finishing second to Kiira Korpi. She was seventeenth at the 2013 European Championships but was eliminated from the 2013 World Championships after placing thirty-first in the short program.

==== 2013–14 season: Finnish national title ====
Turkkila placed seventh at the 2013 Finlandia Trophy and fourteenth at the 2013 Nebelhorn Trophy. She won the gold medal at the 2014 Finnish Championships. She was twelfth at the 2014 European Championships, her best result at the Europeans this far. She did not reach the final at the 2014 World Championships, placing twenty-ninth in the short program.

==== 2014–15 season ====
Turkkila participated at the 2014 Finlandia Trophy, where she placed 7th, and at the 2014 Nebelhorn Trophy, where she placed sixth. On 22 October 2014, it was reported that she had a season-ending injury.

==== 2015–16 season ====
Turkkila returned to competition in 2015, placing 5th at the Lombardia Trophy. She was tenth at the 2015 Nebelhorn Trophy and fourteenth at the 2015 Finlandia Trophy. In December 2015, Turkkila won the bronze medal at the Finnish Championships. On 20 January 2016, the Finnish Figure Skating Association reported that her season was over due to a groin strain. Tarja Sipilä coached Turkkila at Helsingin Luistelijat figure skating club in Helsinki.

On 1 April 2016, the Finnish Figure Skating Association reported that Turkkila had teamed up with Matthias Versluis to compete in ice dancing.

=== Competitive ice dance career ===
==== 2016–17 season: Switch to ice dance and debut of Turkkila/Versluis ====
Making their international debut, Turkkila/Versluis placed sixth at the NRW Trophy in November 2016. Later that month, they finished 13th at their first ISU Challenger Series assignment, the 2016 CS Tallinn Trophy. In December, they took the silver medal behind Törn/Partanen at the 2017 Finnish Championships. In February, they represented Finland at the 2017 Winter Universiade, finishing eighth.

==== 2017–18 season ====
Turkkila/Versluis competed at a pair of Challenger Series competitions – placing tenth at the 2017 CS Lombardia Trophy, and fifteenth at the 2017 CS Finlandia Trophy – and then finished thirteenth at the International Cup of Nice. In November, they won bronze at the Ice Challenge in Austria. In December, they repeated as national silver medalists, again finishing second to Törn/Partanen.

==== 2018–19 season: First national title, World, European, and Grand Prix debut ====
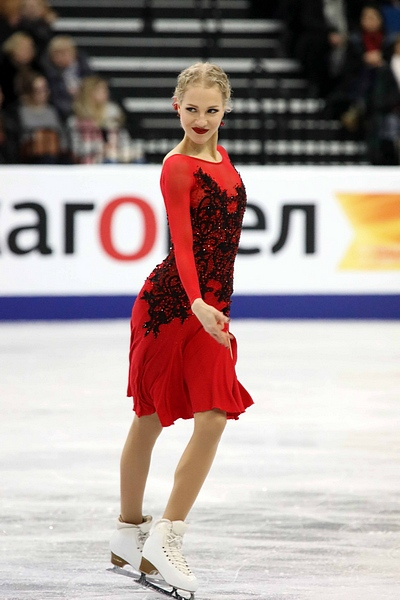
Turkkila at the 2019 European Championships

Turkkila/Versluis began their season with three Challenger Series events – they finished sixth at the 2018 CS Lombardia Trophy, seventh at the 2018 CS Ondrej Nepela Trophy, and sixth at the 2018 CS Finlandia Trophy. In October, the duo won silver at the Minsk-Arena Ice Star. In November, they debuted on the Grand Prix series, placing sixth at the 2018 Grand Prix of Helsinki, and then took bronze at the Warsaw Cup. The following month, they became the Finnish national champions and were selected to compete at the 2019 European Championships in Minsk, Belarus, where they placed eleventh. They then competed at their first World Championships, placing sixteenth.

==== 2019–20 season & 2020–21 seasons: Struggles with injury ====
Turkkila sustained a neck injury in a practice session at the 2019 CS Lombardia Trophy, compelling the team to withdraw from the competition. They subsequently also withdrew from the 2019 CS Finlandia Trophy and the 2019 Rostelecom Cup, their Grand Prix assignment for the year. They were assigned to compete at the World Championships in Montreal, but these were cancelled as a result of the coronavirus pandemic.

Returning to competition for the first time in two years, Turkkila/Versluis represented Finland at the 2021 World Championships in Stockholm, placing twenty-first after a fluke error on the rotational lift.

==== 2021–22 season: Beijing Olympics ====
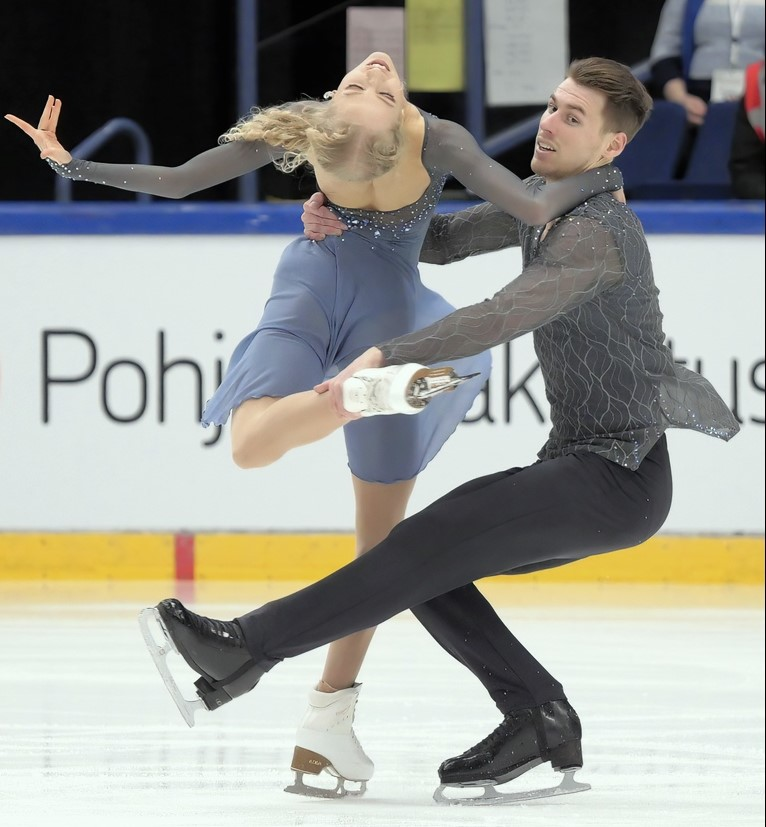
Turkkila/Versluis at the 2021 CS Finlandia Trophy

Turkkila/Versluis began the Olympic season at the 2021 CS Lombardia Trophy, where they placed sixth. They were assigned to the 2021 CS Nebelhorn Trophy, seeing to qualify a place for Finland at the 2022 Winter Olympics. They placed first in both programs, setting three new personal bests to take both their first Challenger gold and the first of four available dance spots. At their third Challenger event of the season, the 2021 CS Finlandia Trophy, Turkkila/Versluis came sixth, notably managing fourth place in the free dance. They competed at the 2021 Cup of Nice, also known as Trophée Métropole Nice, where they won gold, before going on to make their Grand Prix appearance at the 2021 Internationaux de France, where they finished in seventh.

After winning their second Finnish national title, Turkkila/Versluis were named to the Finnish Olympic team. Turkkila had a mild case of COVID-19 in late December and recovered, but because she continued to test positive, the team was unable to participate in the 2022 European Championships.

Making their appearance at the Beijing Olympics dance event, Turkkila/Versluis were the first Finnish ice dancers to appear in the Winter Olympics since Rahkamo/Kokko in 1994. They placed sixteenth in the rhythm dance, qualifying for the free dance. They moved up one place in the free dance, finishing fifteenth.

Turkkila/Versluis concluded the season at the 2022 World Championships, held in Montpellier. They finished twelfth.

==== 2022–23 season: Grand Prix and European Championships bronze ====
Turkkila/Versluis won the bronze medal at the 2022 CS Finlandia Trophy before taking the gold medal at the 2022 Cup of Nice. They were considered medal contenders going into the Grand Prix, but placed eighth in the rhythm dance after Turkkila fell during the twizzle sequence. They were fifth in the free dance, rising to seventh overall. Their second event was the 2022 Grand Prix of Espoo, held on home ice in Finland instead of the Rostelecom Cup as a result of the Russo-Ukrainian War. They finished fourth in the rhythm dance with a new personal best score of 75.06, 1.16 points behind third-place Americans Carreira/Ponomarenko. In the free dance, they rose to third overall with another new personal best (116.73), taking the bronze medal with a total score of 191.79. They were the lone Finnish medalists at the Finnish Grand Prix event and the first Finnish dance team to ever medal in the Grand Prix. Turkkila said that the result "gives us a lot of confidence. We know what we are capable of, and we want to achieve more. This is just the beginning."

After winning their third Finnish national title, Turkkila/Versluis were their country's primary medal hope at a home European Championships, hosted, like the Grand Prix, in Espoo. This was their first appearance at the European Championships since 2019. They finished third in the rhythm dance with a new personal best score of 77.56, 0.23 points ahead of fourth-place Lithuanian team Reed/Ambrulevičius. In the free dance, Turkkila/Versluis set new personal bests in that segment and overall, and won the bronze medal. This was the first European medal for a Finnish dance team since Rahkamo/Kokko's gold in 1995. Versluis called it "absolutely amazing," especially in light of their previous absences.

Turkkila/Versluis concluded the season at the 2023 World Championships in Saitama, where they finished ninth, the first time since 1995 that a Finnish team placed in the top ten. Turkkila commented that "in August, you couldn't have imagined that there would be a season like this. All expectations have been exceeded."

==== 2023–24 season ====
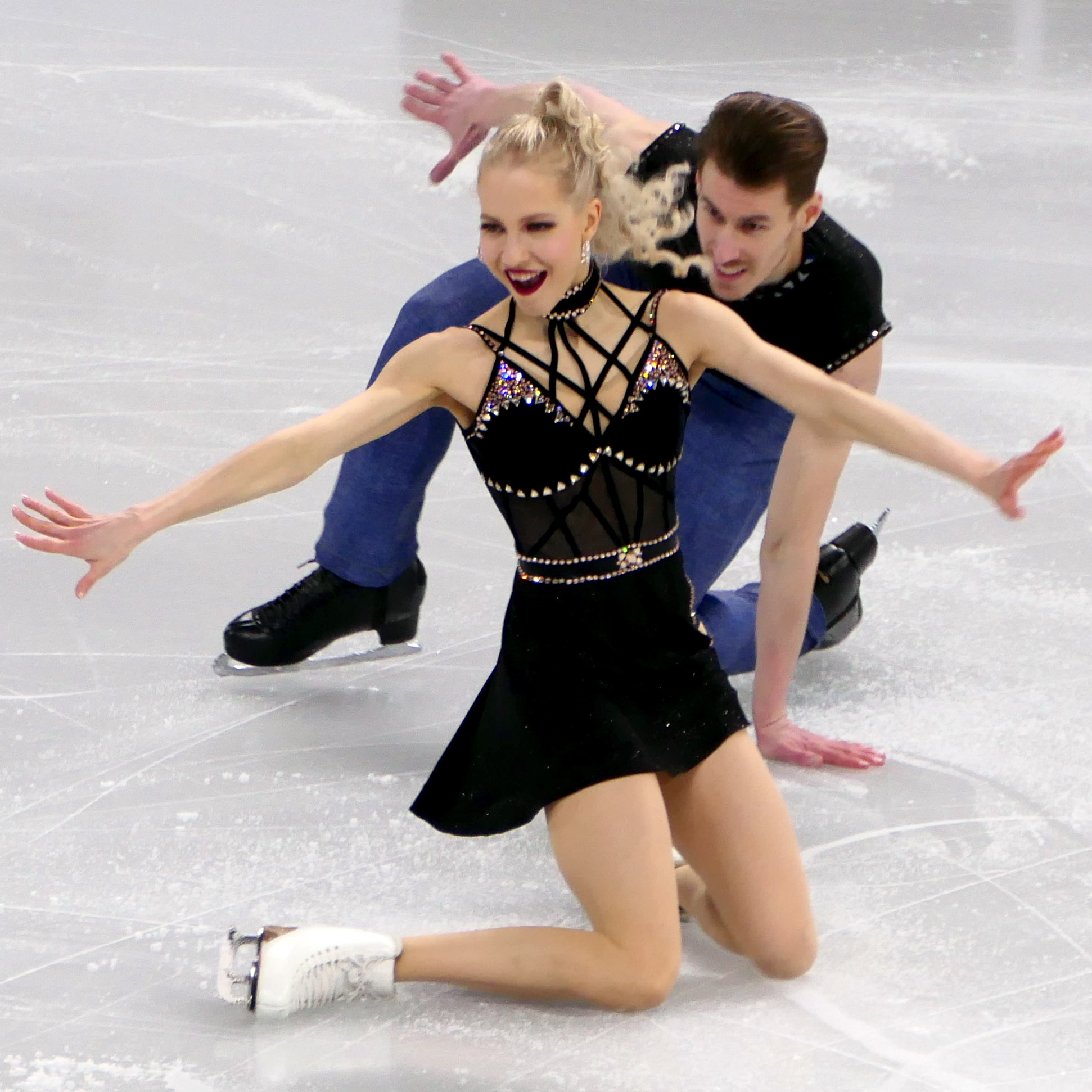
Turkkila and Versluis performing their rhythm dance at the 2024 World Championships

Beginning the season at the 2023 CS Nebelhorn Trophy, Turkkila/Versluis won the bronze medal. Competing next on home ice at the 2023 CS Finlandia Trophy, they won the rhythm dance. Second in the free dance, they remain in first place overall, becoming the first Finnish dance team to win the gold medal at the Finlandia Trophy. The duo noted that the Espoo Metro Areena had been the site of many milestones in their careers, including national singles championships, making it a place of "many meanings." With Finland again hosting on the Grand Prix in the same venue, they won another bronze medal at the 2023 Grand Prix of Espoo. Turkkila/Versluis went on to finish fourth at the 2023 NHK Trophy, which they said they considered a strong result given that they were competing on consecutive weekends. Turkkila said they were "overall very happy" with the first half of the season.

After claiming their fourth national gold medal, Turkkila/Versluis sought to defend their podium place at the 2024 European Championships. They came sixth in both segments, placing sixth overall. They received a deduction of an extra element in the free dance, which they said they would research for future performances to understand the error. They then finished the season at the 2024 World Championships, coming tenth. Turkkila praised the crowd at the Montreal event as "amazing," while admitting that "result wise, we could have done even a bit better this season, especially at Europeans. But the field is big and competitive."

==== 2024–25 season ====
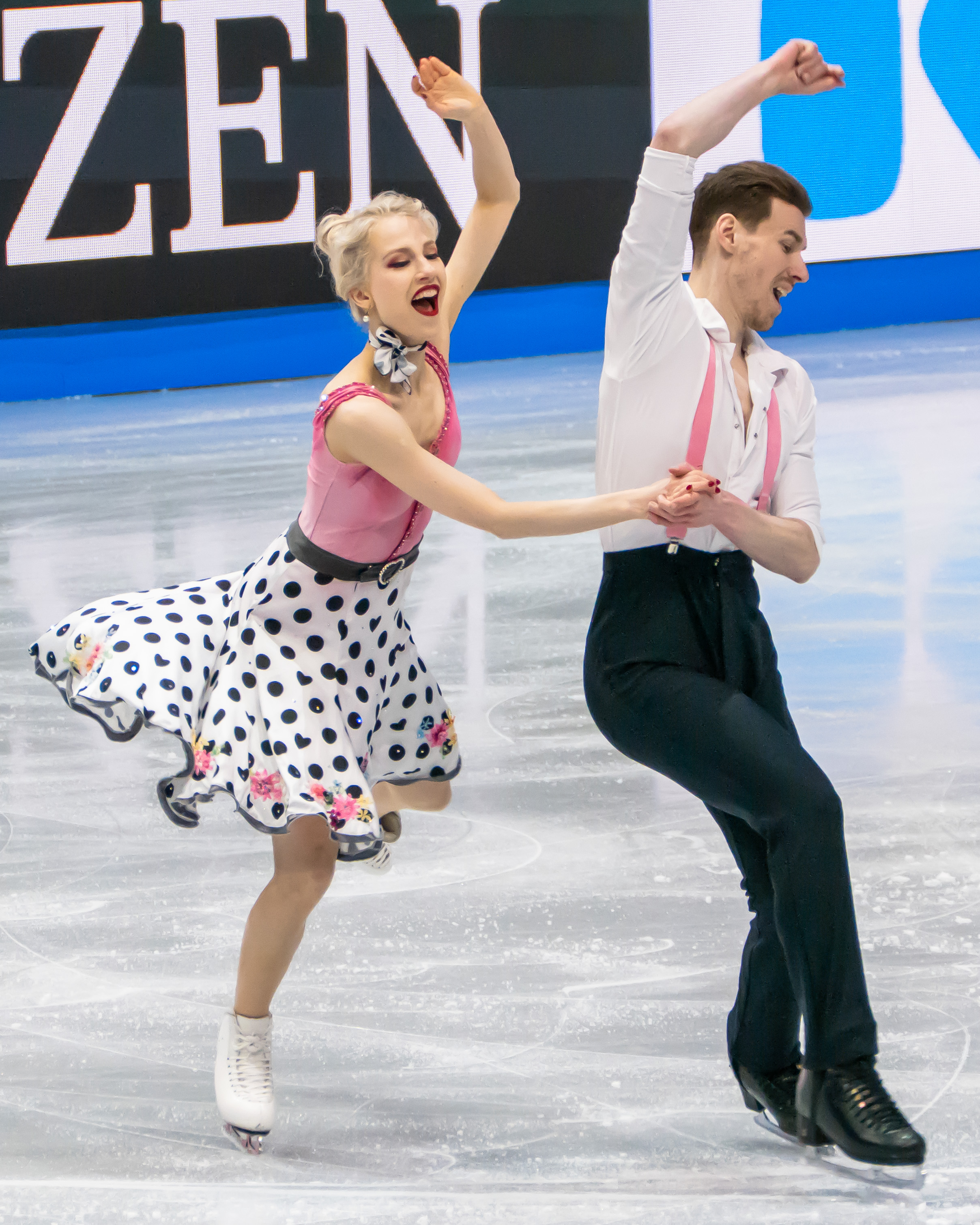
Turkkila/Versluis performing their rhythm dance at the 2025 World Championships

Turkkila and Versluis shared that their goal for the 2024-25 figure skating season was to either match or surpass their achievements from the 2023–24 figure skating season. They began the season by competing on the Challenger circuit, winning bronze at the 2024 CS Budapest Trophy and finishing fourth at the 2024 CS Nepela Memorial. Going on to compete on the 2024–25 Grand Prix series, they were first assigned to the 2024 Finlandia Trophy, which was for the first time held as part of the Grand Prix rather than the Challenger series. They again won the bronze medal on home ice, with their tango-themed free dance earning a notable audience response. The following week they competed at the 2024 Cup of China, where they were fifth.

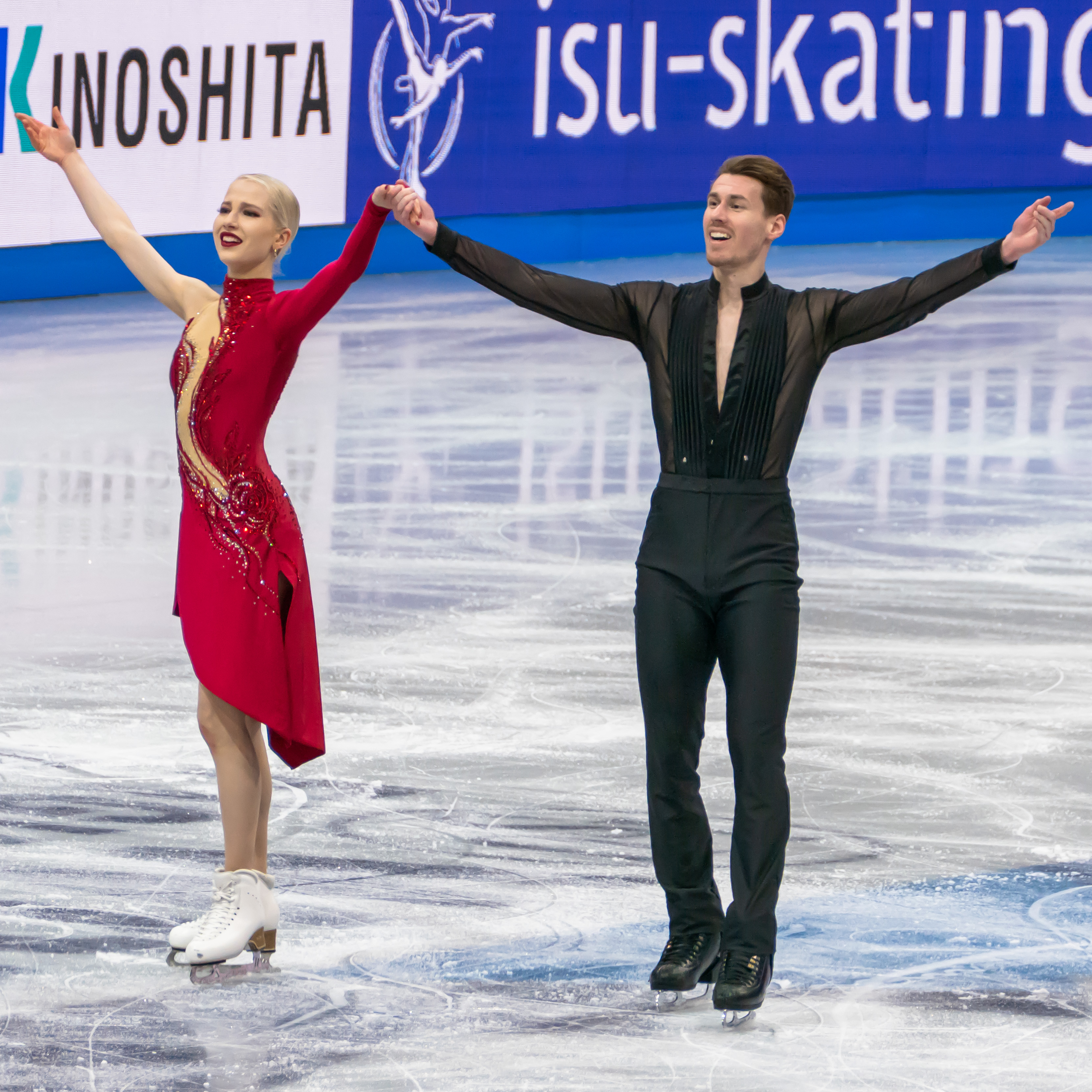
Turkkila/Versluis following their free dance at the 2025 World Championships

In December, Turkkila/Versluis would win their fifth national title at the 2025 Finnish Championships. The following month they participated in the 2025 European Championships in Tallinn, coming fourth in the rhythm dance despite Versluis losing two levels on his twizzle element. Their score of 81.26 was 0.31 points back of third-place Britons Fear/Gibson. They placed third in the free dance with a new personal best score of 124.43 despite each losing a twizzle level, receiving a bronze small medal for the segment, but remained in fourth overall. Both said they had found the event difficult, but Turkkila added that it was "still meaningful to have the small medal for the tango, which shows that the tango was appreciated by the public and the judges."

Following the European Championships, Turkkila/Versluis participated in the Road to 26 Trophy, the test event for the 2026 Winter Olympics, held at Milan's Forum di Milano. They won the gold medal. They finished the season at the 2025 World Championships in Boston, Massachusetts, United States, which were also the primary qualifying event for the Milan Olympics. Skating in the penultimate group of the rhythm dance, Versluis fell in their midline step sequence, resulting in them scoring only 68.09. They initially appeared poised to miss qualification for the free dance by one ordinal, but after Lithuanian team Reed/Ambrulevičius also had a fall and dropped below them, they were instead the final team to qualify, twentieth in the segment. Turkkila/Versluis were seventh in the free dance, rising to eleventh overall. Turkkila said it had been "an absolute roller coaster of emotions when we learned in the locker room that maybe there was a chance we would get to skate this free dance again. It felt like a gift, and we are so happy we could end our season with a happy memory." Their placement, in addition to Orihara/Pirinen's fourteenth-place finish won Finland two quotas for ice dance at the 2026 Winter Olympics.

==== 2025–26 season: Injury & Milano Cortina Olympics ====
Turkkila/Versluis at the 2026 Winter Olympics

Although assigned to compete at 2025 Skate Canada International, Turkkila/Versluis withdrew from the event due to Versluis sustaining a leg nerve injury during the off-season. They subsequently withdrew from the 2025 Finlandia Trophy as well.

In December, Turkkila/Versluis returned to competition at the 2026 Finnish Championships, winning their sixth national title. The following month, they competed at the 2026 European Championships in Sheffield, England, United Kingdom, finishing in eighth place.

Turkkila/Versluis competed at the 2026 Winter Olympics, finishing in twelfth place overall. “Compared to Beijing, the goal there was actually just to qualify and that already was a huge achievement, coming here. Our main goal back then was to be on top of the world, but of course there was a big injury at the beginning of the season. So we had to reset our minds, be grateful for the journey we had over these few years, and be grateful that we are able to be here and skate as strong as we could today. Expectations are high, of course, but we also have to appreciate where we are at the moment" shared Turkkila.

The following month, the team competed at the 2026 World Championships. Turkkila/Versluis placed eleventh in the short program, but withdrew from the free skate due to medical reasons.

=== 2026–27 season ===
Turkkila/Versluis kicked off their season this fall at 2026 CS Nepela Memorial and 2026 CS Denis Ten Memorial Challenge where they placed second and first, respectively.

In November, they took silver at 2026 Finlandia Trophy behind Laurence Fournier Beaudry and Guillaume Cizeron.

== Programs ==
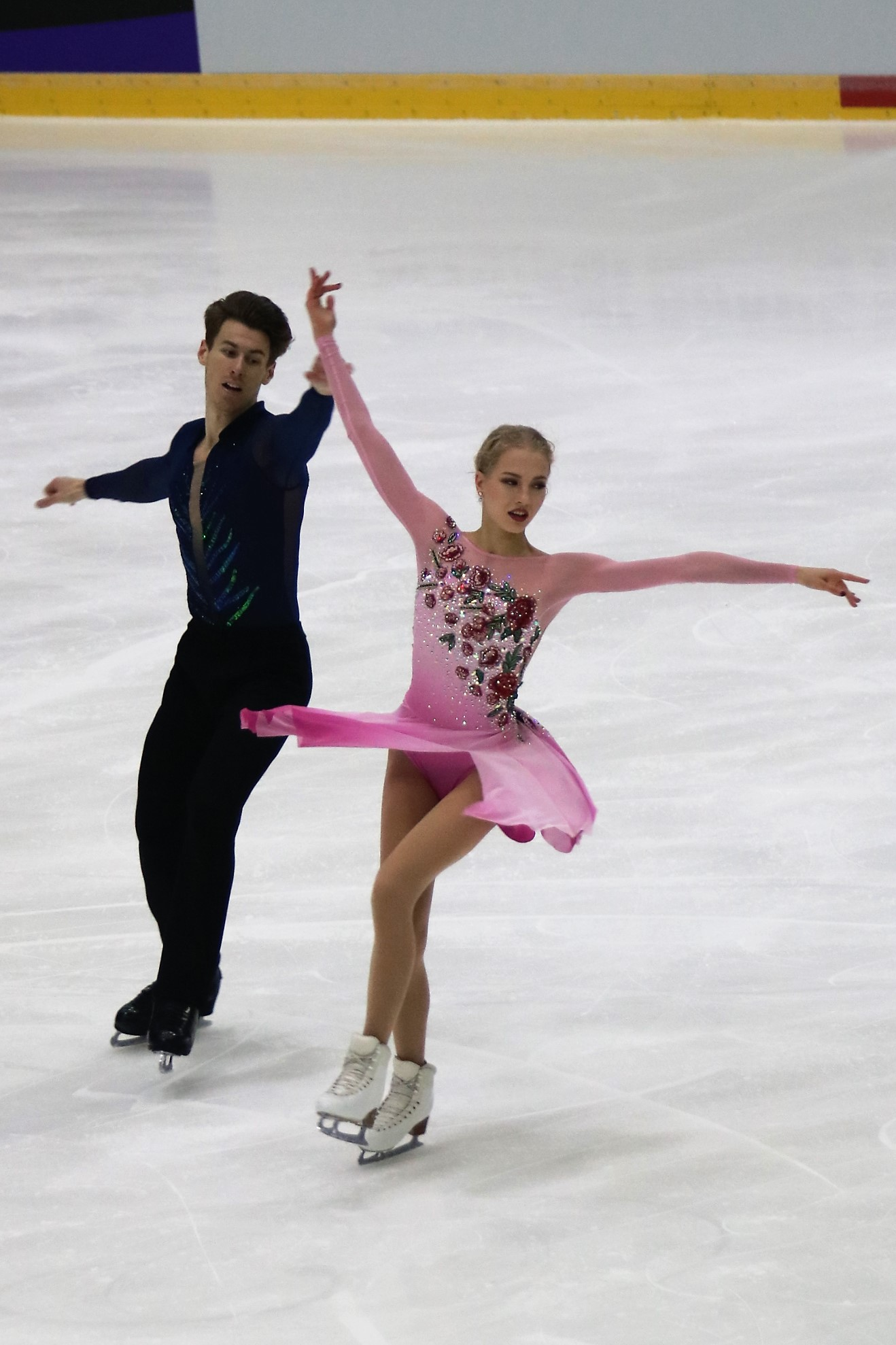
Turkkila and Versluis at the 2018 Grand Prix of Helsinki

=== Ice dance with Matthias Versluis ===
Season	Rhythm dance	Free dance	Exhibition
2026-2027	Giselle: Act I: Marche des Vignerons; Valse (Act II); Valse, Pas des Vendanges; Galop Général by Adolphe Adam choreo. by Massimo Scali	Giselle: Act II (Modern Interpretation): Split, Postcards from Far Away "The Tea Room" by Ezio Bosso; Preludio Op. 28 No. 4 "The Painroom" by Frédéric Chopin and Ezio Bosso choreo. by Massimo Scali	
2025–26	María (Pablo Flores Spanglish Radio Edit); Love You For a Day; The Cup of Life (Remix - English Radio Edit) by Ricky Martin choreo. by Massimo Scali	Bewitched by Per Störby; Obcy Astronom (Remastered 2021) by Grzegorz Ciechowski & Zbigniew Krzywański choreo. by Massimo Scali	Me and Mrs. Jones by Billy Paul; María (Pablo Flores Spanglish Radio Edit); Love You For a Day; The Cup of Life (Remix - English Radio Edit) by Ricky Martin choreo. by Massimo Scali
2024–25	I Got You (I Feel Good) by James Brown; Land of a Thousand Dances by Chris Kenner performed by Wilson Pickett choreo. by Massimo Scali	Bewitched by Per Störby; Obcy Astronom (Remastered 2021) by Grzegorz Ciechowski & Zbigniew Krzywański choreo. by Massimo Scali	Lose Control by Teddy Swims
2023–24	Tell It to My Heart (Club Mix); I'll Always Love You (Single Mix); Prove Your Love (Extended Remix) by Taylor Dayne choreo. by Massimo Scali	Mass (Re-Imagined); Loss by Phoria choreo. by Massimo Scali	Hullaannun by Younghearted
2022–23	Samba: Rebelado by Watazu; Rhumba: Wicked Game by Ursine Vulpine, Annaca; Samba: Jao Geralderry by Watazu; Samba: Banto by Kaoma, Loalwa Braz, Michel Abihssira choreo. by Pasquale Camerlengo, Massimo Scali	4 Impromptus, Op. 90, D. 899: No. 3 in G-Flat Major: Andante; Piano Sonata No. 20 In A Major, D.959: IV. Rondo (Allegretto); 4 Impromptus, Op. 90, D. 899: No. 3 in G-Flat Major: Andante by Franz Schubert choreo. by Pasquale Camerlengo, Massimo Scali	Hullaannun by Younghearted; Smiles for Y; Unconditioned (Following, A Bird) by Ezio Bosso; Fortitude by Haevn choreo. by Pasquale Camerlengo, Massimo Scali
2021–22	Blues: Breathe You In My Dreams by Trixie Whitley; Hip Hop: River by Bishop Briggs choreo. by Pasquale Camerlengo, Maurizio Margaglio, Neil Brown, Luca Lanotte, Sini Parkkinen	Wild Side by Roberto Cacciapaglia; Bruises by Lewis Capaldi choreo. by Pasquale Camerlengo, Maurizio Margaglio, Neil Brown, Luca Lanotte, Sini Parkkinen	
2019–21	Quickstep: Overture; Swing: What Do I Need With Love?; Forget About the Boy (from Thoroughly Modern Millie) by Jeanine Tesori & Dick Scanlan choreo. by Pasquale Camerlengo, Massimo Scali	Smiles for Y; Unconditioned (Following, A Bird) by Ezio Bosso; Fortitude by Haevn choreo. by Pasquale Camerlengo, Massimo Scali	
2018–19	Coco Before Chanel by Alexandre Desplat; Tango: Verano Porteño performed by Mario & Daniel Celaro; Flamenco: Poeta en Mar by Vicente Amigo choreo. by Pasquale Camerlengo, Massimo Scali	Piano Concerto No. 20 in D Minor, K. 466 by Wolfgang Amadeus Mozart; I. Allegro; II. Romance choreo. by Pasquale Camerlengo, Massimo Scali	
	Short dance		
2017–18	Beautiful Maria Of My Soul by Arne Glimcher, Robert Kraft; Afro Bongo by Watazu; De Donde Soy performed by Thalía	Ghost: The Musical by David A. Stewart, Glen Ballard; Overture; Unchained Melody; Sam's Murder; With You	
2016–17	Bei Mir Bistu Shein by Sholom Secunda	Romeo & Juliet by Abel Korzeniowski	

=== Single skating ===
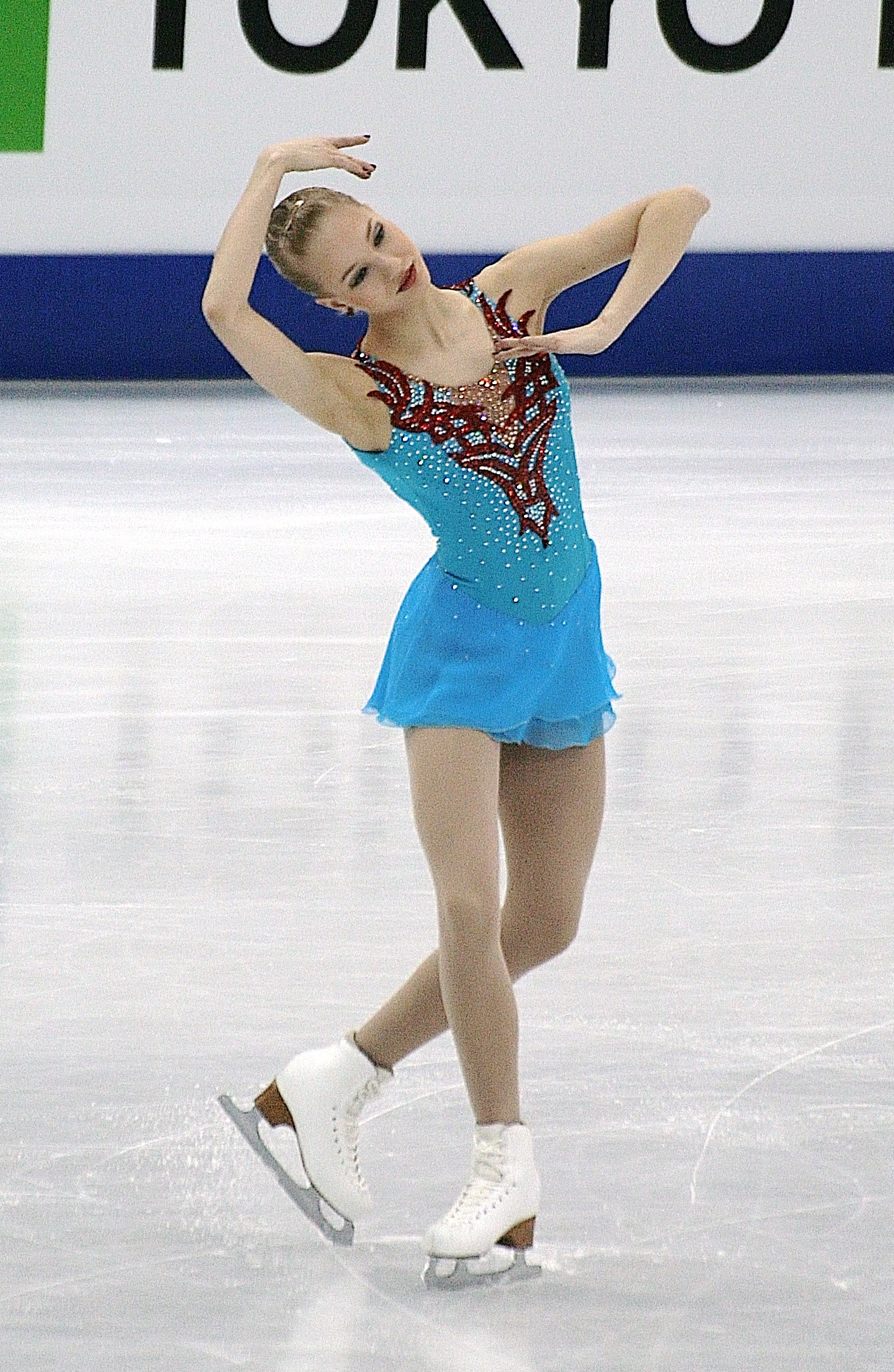
Turkkila at the 2012 World Championships

Season	Short program	Free skating
2015–16	Gabriel's Oboe (Whispers in a Dream) by Ennio Morricone, Hayley Westenra	Liebesträume by Franz Liszt
2014–15	Gabriel's Oboe (Whispers in a Dream) by Ennio Morricone, Hayley Westenra	La gazza ladra by Gioachino Rossini
2013–14	The Firebird by Igor Stravinsky	La gazza ladra by Gioachino Rossini
2012–13	The Firebird by Igor Stravinsky	Scheherazade by Nikolai Rimsky-Korsakov
2011–12	Happy Valley by Andy Hill, Vanessa-Mae	Scheherazade by Nikolai Rimsky-Korsakov
2010–11	Happy Valley by Andy Hill, Vanessa-Mae	Don Quixote by Ludwig Minkus
2009–10		Don Quixote by Ludwig Minkus

== Competitive highlights ==
- GP – Event of the ISU Grand Prix Series
- JGP – Event of the ISU Junior Grand Prix Series
- CS – Event of the ISU Challenger Series
- TBD – Assigned
- WD – Withdrew from competition

=== Ice dance with Matthias Versluis ===
Competition placements at senior level
Season	2016–17	2017–18	2018–19	2019–20	2020–21	2021–22	2022–23	2023–24	2024–25	2025–26	2026-27
Winter Olympics						15th				12th	
World Championships			16th	C	21st	12th	9th	10th	11th	WD	
European Championships			11th				3rd	6th	4th	8th	
Finnish Championships	2nd	2nd	1st			1st	1st	1st	1st	1st	
GP Cup of China									5th		
GP Finland			6th				3rd	3rd	3rd		2nd
GP France						7th	7th				
GP NHK Trophy								4th			TBD
CS Budapest Trophy									3rd		
CS Finlandia Trophy		15th	6th			6th	3rd	1st			
CS Lombardia Trophy		10th	6th			6th					
CS Nebelhorn Trophy						1st		3rd			
CS Nepela Memorial			7th						4th		2nd
CS Tallinn Trophy	13th										
CS Denis Ten Memorial											1st
Egna Dance Trophy		5th		1st							
Ice Challenge		3rd									
Ice Star			2nd								
NRW Trophy	6th										
Open d'Andorra		5th									
Road to 26 Trophy									1st		
Swiss Open								1st			
Trophée Métropole Nice		13th				1st	1st				
Warsaw Cup			3rd								
Winter Universiade	8th		4th								
Bavarian Open	11th	6th	3rd								

=== Single skating ===
Competition placements at senior level
Season	2010–11	2011–12	2012–13	2013–14	2014–15	2015–16
World Championships	20th	18th	31st	29th		
European Championships	15th	17th	17th	12th		
Finnish Championships		2nd	2nd	1st		3rd
CS Finlandia Trophy		6th	6th	7th	7th	14th
CS Nebelhorn Trophy			9th	14th	6th	10th
CS Warsaw Cup						6th
Challenge Cup			6th			
Cup of Nice			8th	21st		
Ice Challenge	7th	9th				
Lombardia Trophy						5th
Nordic Championships	3rd	1st		5th		
Skate Helena				1st		
Volvo Open Cup				3rd		

Competition placements at junior level
Season	2009–10	2010–11	2011–12
World Junior Championships		16th	19th
Finnish Championships	4th	1st	
JGP Estonia			13th
JGP Germany		10th	
JGP Poland			13th
Ice Challenge	10th		
Nordic Championships	5th		

== Detailed results ==
=== Ice dance with Matthias Versluis ===
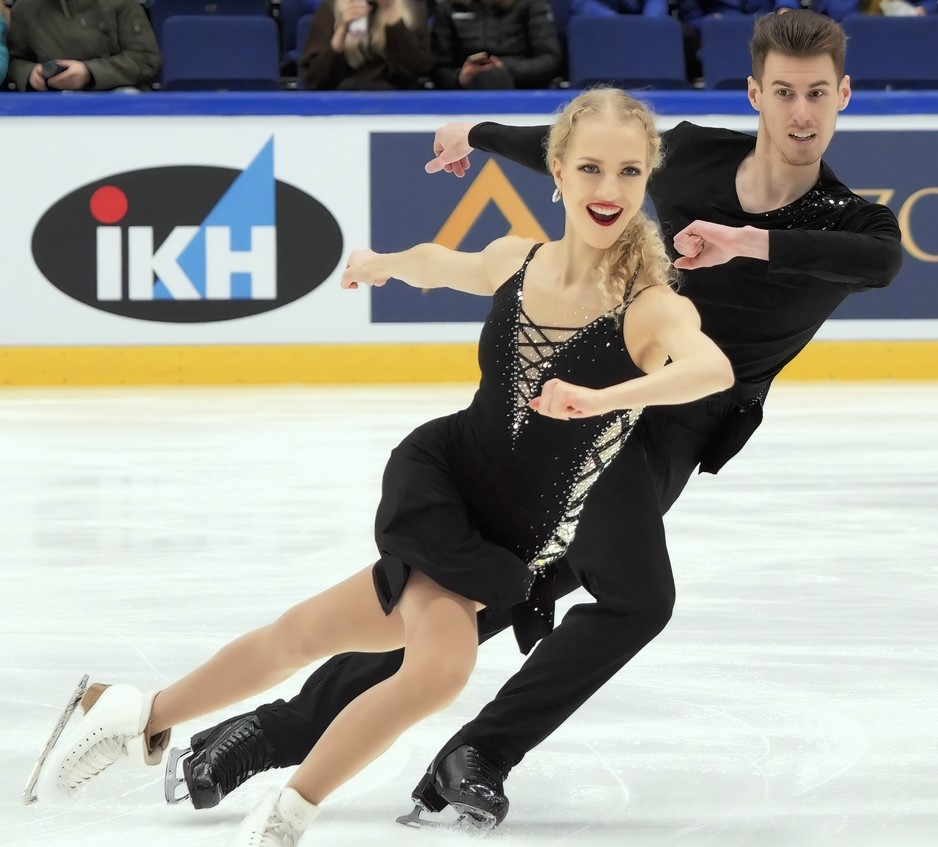
Turkkila/Versluis at the 2021 CS Finlandia Trophy

ISU personal best scores in the +5/-5 GOE System
Segment	Type	Score	Event
Total	TSS	205.69	2025 European Championships
Rhythm dance	TSS	81.26	2025 European Championships
Rhythm dance	TES	46.21	2025 European Championships
Rhythm dance	PCS	35.05	2025 European Championships
Free dance	TSS	124.43	2025 European Championships
Free dance	TES	69.57	2025 European Championships
Free dance	PCS	54.86	2025 European Championships

Results in the 2026–27 season
Date	Event	SP		FS		Total	
Date	Event	P	Score	P	Score	P	Score
Sep 24–27, 2026	(Slovakia) 2026 CS Nepela Memorial	3	76.45	2	117.65	2	194.10

Results in the 2025–26 season
Date	Event	RD		FD		Total	
Date	Event	P	Score	P	Score	P	Score
Dec 12–14, 2025	(Finland) 2026 Finnish Championships	1	80.51	1	119.94	1	200.45
Jan 13–18, 2026	(United Kingdom) 2026 European Championships	7	78.59	8	115.24	8	193.83
Feb 9-11, 2026	(Italy) 2026 Winter Olympics	12	77.96	13	118.07	12	196.03
Mar 24–29, 2026	(Czech Republic) 2026 World Championships	11	78.03	—N/a	—N/a	–	WD

2024–2025 season
Date	Event	RD	FD	Total
March 26–30, 2025	2025 World Championships	20; 68.09	7; 120.86	11; 188.95
February 18–20, 2025	Road to 26 Trophy	1; 79.24	1; 122.47	1; 201.71
January 28 – February 2, 2025	2025 European Championships	4; 81.26	3; 124.43	4; 205.69
December 13–15, 2024	2025 Finnish Championships	1; 77.72	1; 122.81	1; 200.53
November 22–24, 2024	2024 Cup of China	4; 77.80	5; 114.77	5; 192.57
November 15–17, 2024	2024 Finlandia Trophy	3; 78.31	2; 118.29	3; 196.60
October 25–27, 2024	2024 CS Nepela Memorial	3; 76.31	5; 109.73	4; 186.04
October 11–13, 2024	2024 CS Budapest Trophy	3; 72.34	2; 116.67	3; 189.01
2023–2024 season
Date	Event	RD	FD	Total
March 18–24, 2024	2024 World Championships	9; 75.89	10; 116.45	10; 192.34
January 8–14, 2024	2024 European Championships	6; 76.36	6; 115.72	6; 192.08
December 10–14, 2023	2024 Finnish Championships	1; 80.84	1; 124.57	1; 205.41
November 24–26, 2023	2023 NHK Trophy	4; 74.66	4; 116.35	4; 191.01
November 17–19, 2023	2023 Grand Prix of Espoo	3; 77.65	3; 118.15	3; 195.80
October 26–29, 2023	2023 Swiss Open	1; 73.04	1; 122.93	1; 195.97
October 4–8, 2023	2023 CS Finlandia Trophy	1; 75.76	2; 117.97	1; 193.73
September 20–23, 2023	2023 CS Nebelhorn Trophy	3; 69.68	3; 113.95	3; 183.63
2022–23 season
Date	Event	RD	FD	Total
March 20–26, 2023	2023 World Championships	8; 76.97	9; 116.57	9; 193.54
January 23–29, 2023	2023 European Championships	3; 77.56	3; 120.65	3; 198.21
December 16–18, 2022	2023 Finnish Championships	1; 79.74	1; 121.80	1; 201.54
November 25–27, 2022	2022 Grand Prix of Espoo	4; 75.06	3; 116.73	3; 191.79
November 4–6, 2022	2022 Grand Prix de France	8; 63.85	5; 108.63	7; 172.48
October 18–23, 2022	2022 Trophée Métropole Nice Côte d'Azur	1; 71.17	1; 112.66	1; 183.83
October 5–9, 2022	2022 CS Finlandia Trophy	3; 74.35	3; 111.95	3; 186.30
2021–22 season
Date	Event	RD	FD	Total
March 21–27, 2022	2022 World Championships	12; 71.88	12; 104.07	12; 175.95
February 12–14, 2022	2022 Winter Olympics	16; 68.23	15; 105.65	15; 173.88
December 17–19, 2021	2022 Finnish Championships	1; 75.93	1; 120.78	1; 196.71
November 19–21, 2021	2021 Internationaux de France	7; 64.62	5; 106.40	7; 171.02
October 20–24, 2021	2021 Trophée Métropole Nice Côte d'Azur	1; 71.43	1; 109.51	1; 180.94
October 7–10, 2021	2021 CS Finlandia Trophy	8; 71.92	4; 113.27	6; 185.19
September 21–25, 2021	2021 CS Nebelhorn Trophy	1; 70.92	1; 110.27	1; 181.19
September 10–12, 2021	2021 CS Lombardia Trophy	7; 67.26	5; 103.97	6; 171.23
2020–21 season
Date	Event	RD	FD	Total
March 22–28, 2021	2021 World Championships	21; 64.59	–	21; 64.59
2019–20 season
Date	Event	SP	FS	Total
February 7–9, 2020	2020 Egna Dance Trophy	2; 73.65	1; 109.23	1; 182.88
2018–19 season
Date	Event	RD	FD	Total
March 18–24, 2019	2019 World Championships	18; 66.01	16; 102.11	16; 168.12
March 6–9, 2019	2019 Winter Universiade	4; 63.80	4; 107.42	4; 171.22
February 5–10, 2019	2019 Bavarian Open	1; 72.30	4; 94.30	3; 166.60
January 21–27, 2019	2019 European Championships	10; 67.18	12; 101.16	11; 168.34
December 15–16, 2018	2019 Finnish Championships	1; 68.79	1; 103.91	1; 172.70
November 23–25, 2018	2018 Warsaw Cup	3; 63.75	3; 101.16	3; 164.91
November 2–4, 2018	2018 Grand Prix of Helsinki	6; 63.06	6; 97.56	6; 160.62
October 18–21, 2018	2018 Ice Star	3; 60.39	2; 99.12	2; 159.51
October 4–7, 2018	2018 CS Finlandia Trophy	6; 62.46	6; 101.03	6; 163.49
September 19–22, 2018	2018 CS Ondrej Nepela Trophy	6; 60.61	7; 90.05	7; 150.66
September 12–16, 2018	2018 CS Lombardia Trophy	5; 57.92	6; 86.52	6; 144.44
2017–18 season
Date	Event	RD	FD	Total
February 2–4, 2018	2018 Egna Dance Trophy	5; 55.51	6; 78.04	5; 133.55
January 26–31, 2018	2018 Bavarian Open	6; 53.28	6; 86.05	6; 139.33
December 16–17, 2017	2018 Finnish Championships	2; 54.93	2; 87.65	2; 142.58
November 22–26, 2017	2017 Open d'Andorra	8; 47.83	3; 84.92	5; 132.75
November 9–12, 2017	2017 Ice Challenge	4; 51.35	3; 83.44	3; 134.79
October 11–15, 2017	2017 Trophée Métropole Nice Côte d'Azur	12; 52.08	14; 75.64	13; 127.72
October 6–8, 2017	2017 CS Finlandia Trophy	16; 46.00	16; 75.66	15; 121.66
September 14–17, 2017	2017 CS Lombardia Trophy	10; 49.14	9; 71.30	10; 120.44
2016–17 season
Date	Event	RD	FD	Total
February 14–19, 2016	2017 Bavarian Open	11; 49.86	11; 80.74	11; 130.60
February 1–5, 2016	2017 Winter Universiade	8; 50.60	9; 79.52	8; 130.12
December 15–18, 2016	2017 Finnish Championships	2; 48.42	2; 72.47	2; 120.89
November 19–27, 2016	2016 CS Tallinn Trophy	14; 50.55	12; 77.84	13; 128.39
November 4–6, 2016	2016 NRW Trophy	8; 48.57	6; 71.43	6; 120.00
