= Neil Brown (figure skater) =

French ice dancer (born 1990)

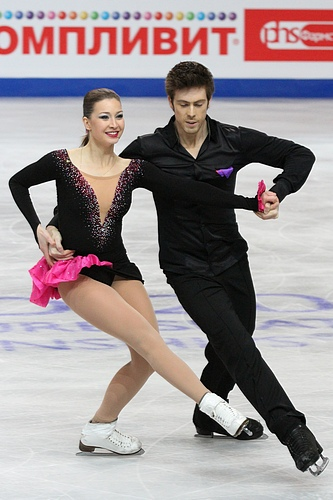
- Brown with Myslivečková in 2012

Personal information
- Born: 11 March 1990 (age 36) L'Arbresle, France
- Home town: Lyon, France
- Height: 1.79 m (5 ft 10 1/2 in)

Figure skating career
- Country: Czech Republic
- Discipline: Ice dance
- Partner: Lucie Myslivečková (CZE); Geraldine Bott (FRA); Rowan Musson (FRA); Maureen Ibanez (FRA); Anne-Sophie Bilet (FRA)
- Coach: Muriel Boucher-Zazoui; Olivier Schoenfelder
- Skating club: Club des Sports de Glace Lyon
- Began skating: 1997
- Retired: 2014

Medal record
Czech Championships
Gold medal – first place	2013 Cieszyn	Ice dance
Gold medal – first place	2014 Bratislava	Ice dance
Silver medal – second place	2012 Ostrava	Ice dance

Neil Brown (born 11 March 1990) is a French ice dancing coach and a former competitive ice dancer.

With Maureen Ibanez, he competed at the 2008 World Junior Championships.

With Geraldine Bott, he competed at the 2010 World Junior Championships and won the bronze medal at 2010 JGP Japan.

He later represented the Czech Republic with Lucie Myslivečková. Together, they are two-time Czech national champions (2013, 2014), and competed at the 2013 World Championships as well as three European Championships (2012, 2013, 2014).

== Coaching career ==
Following his retirement from competitive ice dancing, Brown moved to Helsinki, Finland, where he began working as a coach alongside Maurizio Margaglio.

His current students include:

- (France) Natacha Lagouge / Arnaud Caffa
- (Finland) Yuka Orihara / Juho Pirinen
- (Finland) Juulia Turkkila / Matthias Versluis

His former students have included:

- (Germany) Darya Grimm / Michail Savitskiy
- (Lithuania) Paulina Ramanauskaitė / Deividas Kizala
- (Netherlands) Chelsea Verhaegh / Sherim van Geffen
- (Czech Republic) Eliska Zakova / Filip Mencl

== Programs ==
=== With Myslivečková ===
Season	Short dance	Free dance
2012–2013	Polka: Charlie Chaplin (soundtrack); Waltz: The Artist by Ludovic Bource; March: The Kid by Charlie Chaplin	Pendulum; Challenger by Skrillex; Scary Monsters and Nice Sprinters by Cutting Edge Sound Design; Scary Monsters and Nice Sprinters remix
2011–2012	Whatever Happens by Michael Jackson; Mambo, Mambo by Lou Bega	Tough Lover by Christina Aguilera; Feeling Good by Michael Bublé; Show Me How You Burlesque by Christina Aguilera

=== With Bott ===
Season	Short dance	Free dance
2010–2011	Padam Padam by Edith Piaf	Be Italian by Fergie

=== With Ibanez ===
Season	Original dance	Free dance
2007–2008	Indian dance: Bole Chodiyan by Bhanati	Cirque du Soleil: Atmadja; Xotica by René Duperé; Atmadja; Xotica by René Duperé

== Competitive highlights ==
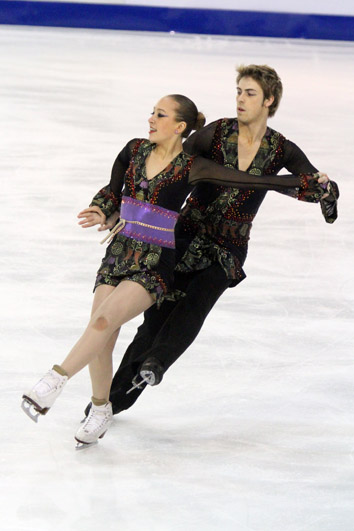
Bott and Brown at the 2010 World Junior Championships

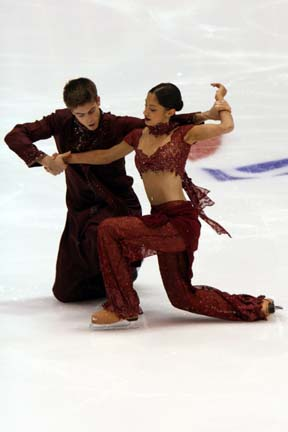
Ibanez and Brown in 2007

=== With Myslivečková for the Czech Republic ===
Results
International
Event	2011–12	2012–13	2013–14
Worlds		21st	
Europeans	19th	14th	26th
Bavarian Open	3rd		
Cup of Nice		5th	10th
Golden Spin	10th		10th
Ice Challenge		2nd	
Nebelhorn		10th	
Ondrej Nepela		5th	10th
Pavel Roman		6th	
Trophy of Lyon	4th	3rd	
National
Czech Champ.	2nd	1st	1st

=== With Bott for France ===
Results
International
Event	2009–10	2010–11
World Junior Championships	10th	
JGP Croatia	9th	
JGP France		5th
JGP Japan		3rd
NRW Trophy	7th J.	4th J.
Trophy of Lyon		3rd J
National
French Junior	2nd J	2nd J
Masters	3rd J	2nd J
J. = Junior level; JGP = Junior Grand Prix

=== With Musson for France ===
Results
International
Event	2008–2009
JGP Mexico	8th
National
French Junior	3rd J
Masters	2nd J
JGP = Junior Grand Prix

=== With Ibanez for France ===
Results
International
Event	2007–2008
World Junior Championships	11th
JGP Austria	9th
JGP United States	6th
National
French Junior	1st J
Masters	2nd J
JGP = Junior Grand Prix
