= Massimo Scali =

Italian ice dancer (born 1979)

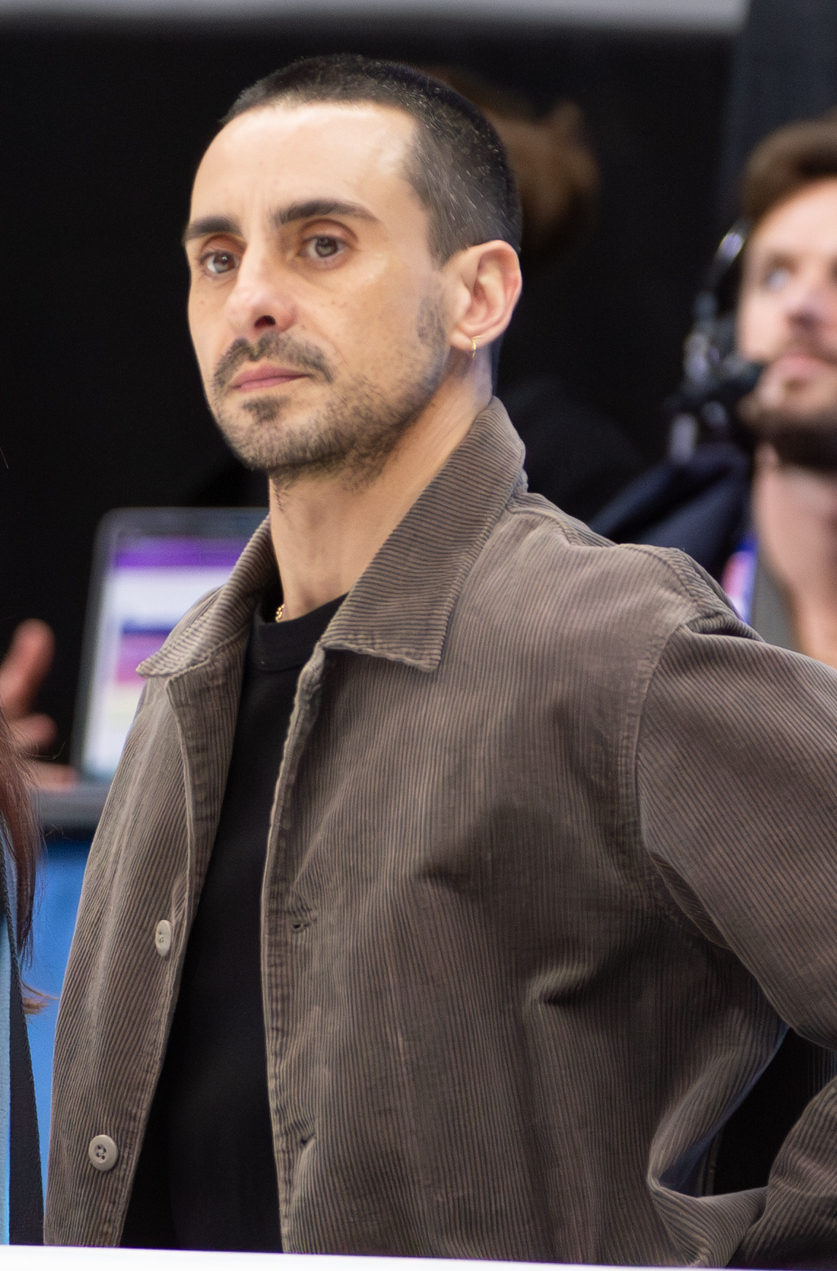
- Massimo Scali at the 2026 U.S. Championships

Personal information
- Born: 11 December 1979 (age 46) Monterotondo, Italy
- Home town: California, United States
- Height: 1.75 m (5 ft 9 in)

Figure skating career
- Country: Italy
- Partner: Federica Faiella
- Skating club: Agora Skating Team
- Retired: 2011

Medal record
Event	Gold medal – first place	Silver medal – second place	Bronze medal – third place
World Championships	0	0	1
European Championships	0	2	0
Italian Championships	7	2	0
Junior Grand Prix Final	0	0	1
Medal list
World Championships
Bronze medal – third place	2010 Turin	Ice dance
European Championships
Silver medal – second place	2009 Helsinki	Ice dance
Silver medal – second place	2010 Tallinn	Ice dance
Italian Championships
Gold medal – first place	2003 Lecco	Ice dance
Gold medal – first place	2004 Milan	Ice dance
Gold medal – first place	2005 Merano	Ice dance
Gold medal – first place	2007 Trento	Ice dance
Gold medal – first place	2008 Milan	Ice dance
Gold medal – first place	2009 Pinerolo	Ice dance
Gold medal – first place	2010 Brescia	Ice dance
Silver medal – second place	2002 Collalbo	Ice dance
Silver medal – second place	2006 Sesto San Giovanni	Ice dance
Junior Grand Prix Final
Bronze medal – third place	1997–98 Lausanne	Ice dance

Massimo Scali (born 11 December 1979) is an Italian former competitive ice dancer. With partner Federica Faiella, he is the 2010 World bronze medalist, a two-time (2009–2010) European silver medalist, and a six-time (2003–2005, 2007–2009) Italian national champion. They also won eleven Grand Prix medals together.

== Personal life ==
Scali was born on December 11, 1979 in Monterotondo, Italy.

Since 2020, he has lived in California, United States, with his partner, Daniel Morales. The pair became engaged in April 2026.

Scali regularly uses his social media platform to advocate for the Freedom of Palestine and has openly condemned Israel's actions in the Gaza war.

== Competitive ice dance career ==
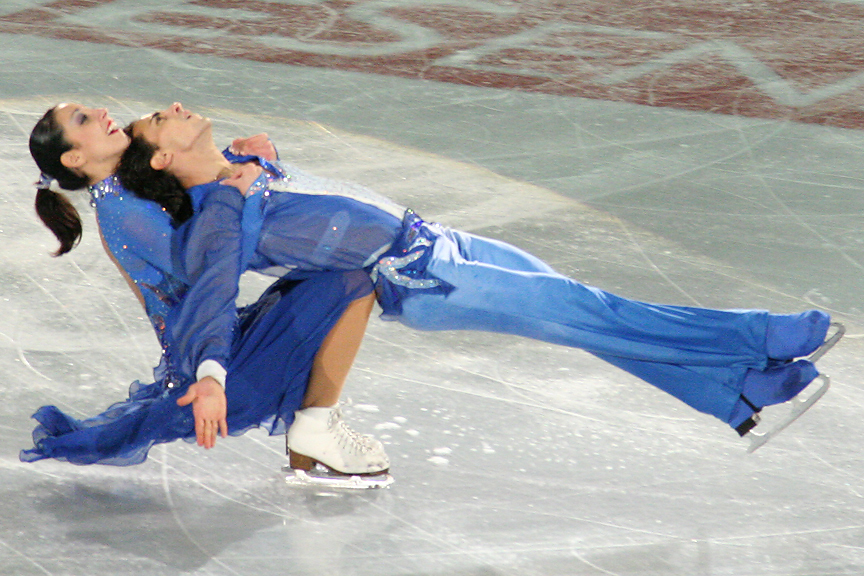
Faiella/Scali perform a reverse lift

=== Early years ===
Massimo Scali began skating at the age of ten. His early ice dance career was with Flavia Ottaviani, with whom he won six medals on the Junior Grand Prix. They were the 1997/1998 Junior Grand Prix Final bronze medalists. He and Faiella trained at the same rink under the same coach. After his partner quit skating, he briefly partnered with Jennifer Wester.

=== Partnership with Faiella ===
Scali teamed up with Federica Faiella in 2001. Despite skating together for only a brief period of time, they were able to qualify for the 2002 Winter Olympics, where they finished 18th.

In their second season of competition together, Faiella/Scali won Italian nationals for the first time, and placed in the top ten at the European Championships. A year later, they moved into the top ten at Worlds. In the years leading up to the 2006 Winter Olympics, they continued to make steady progress up the ranks. Prior to the 2005-06 Olympic season, Barbara Fusar-Poli / Maurizio Margaglio, who won bronze for Italy at the 2002 Games, returned to the eligible ranks. Faiella/Scali became the second Italian team, and finished outside the top ten at the Olympics after a fall in the original dance.

Following the season, they made a coaching change and relocated to the United States to work with Pasquale Camerlengo and Anjelika Krylova at the Detroit Skating Club in Bloomfield Hills, Michigan. They had an up and down season in 2006-07 but enjoyed good results in 2007-08, including a fourth place at the Europeans and a fifth-place finish at Worlds.

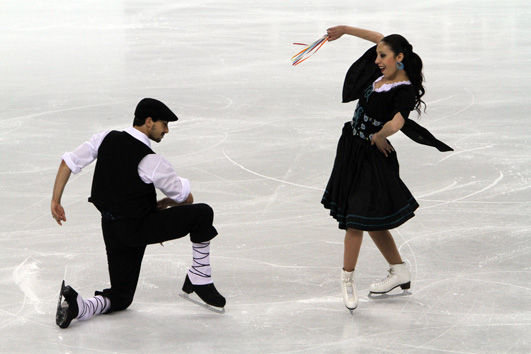
Faiella/Scali perform an Italian folk dance at the World Championships

In the 2008-09 season, Faiella/Scali finished second at the Trophee Eric Bompard and won their first Grand Prix event, the 2008 NHK Trophy. This qualified them for their first Grand Prix final, where they finished fourth. They won their first European medal, a silver, behind Russians Jana Khokhlova / Sergei Novitski. At the 2009 World Championships, a fall in the original dance ended their hopes of medal contention, and they finished eighth.

In the 2009–10 Olympic season, Faiella/Scali began their season with a bronze medal at the 2009 Cup of China. They withdrew from their next Grand Prix event due to Faiella's illness. At the 2010 Europeans, they won both the original dance and the free dance on their way to their second European silver medal. They finished fifth at the Olympics. Faiella fell ill after the Olympics and returned to the ice only four days before the World Championships. The duo won their first world medal, a bronze, in Turin.

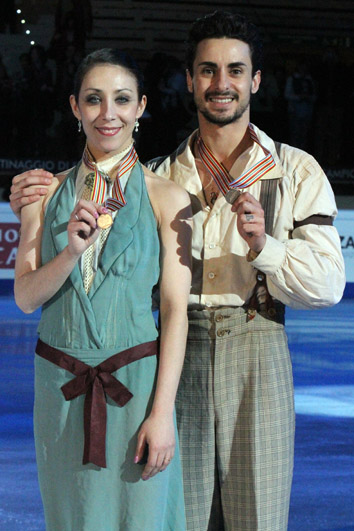
Faiella/Scali during the medal ceremony at the World Championships

At the 2010 World Championships, Faiella/Scali announced that they would return for another season. Their assigned Grand Prix events in 2010-11 were the Cup of China and the Cup of Russia. Visa problems delayed their training in the U.S. and Faiella had recurring back problems. They again finished third at the 2010 Cup of China after Scali tripped on Faiella's skirts in both programs. They withdrew from the 2010 Cup of Russia prior to the free dance due to Scali's back injury. At the 2011 European Championships, they placed ninth in the short dance but moved up to fifth after the free dance.

On 15 March 2011, Scali announced on the team's website that they were retiring from competitive skating and that he would work with coach and choreographer Pasquale Camerlengo's team at the Detroit Skating Club. However, in May 2011, after Faiella's recovery progressed better than expected, they announced through their official website that they would in fact continue to skate competitively. An injury to Faiella ended this comeback attempt, and in 2012 Scali confirmed that they would not return to competitive skating.

Faiella/Scali often performed reverse lifts in competition, in which she lifted him.

== Career as a coach and choreographer ==
In 2011, Scali began working as a coach and choreographer in Bloomfield Hills, Michigan at the Detroit Skating Club, alongside Pasquale Camerlengo, Anjelika Krylova, Natalia Annenko-Deller, and Elizabeth Punsalan.

In 2014, Scali relocated to the Arctic Edge in Canton, Michigan with Marina Zueva. Since 2020, he has coached at the Yerba Buena Ice Skating Center in San Francisco, California.

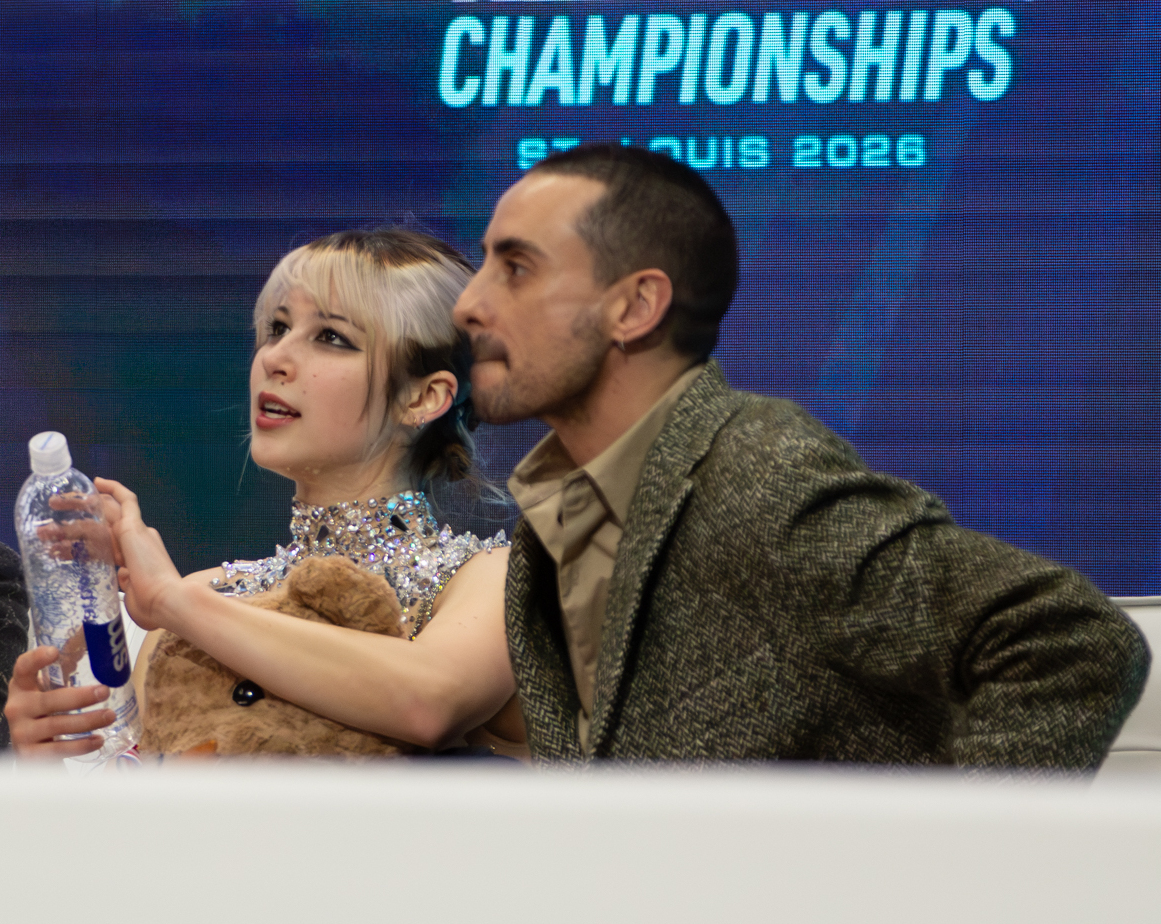
Scali with Alysa Liu at the 2026 U.S. Championships

As a coach, his students have included:

- (Italy) Anna Cappellini / Luca Lanotte
- (Australia) Kimberley Hew-Low / Timothy McKernan
- (United States) Madison Hubbell / Zachary Donohue
- (United States) Mia Kalin
- (United States) Chloe Lewis / Logan Bye
- (United States) Alysa Liu (coached to win the 2025 World title and 2026 Olympic gold medal)
- (Germany) Kavita Lorenz / Joti Polizoakis
- (Japan) Kana Muramoto / Chris Reed
- (Australia) Danielle O'Brien / Gregory Merriman
- (Canada) Alexandra Paul / Mitchell Islam
- (France) Nathalie Péchalat / Fabian Bourzat
- (Lithuania) Allison Reed / Saulius Ambrulevičius
- (Japan) Cathy Reed / Chris Reed
- (United States) Maia Shibutani / Alex Shibutani (coached to win the 2018 Olympic bronze medal)
- (Russia) Victoria Sinitsina / Nikita Katsalapov
- (Czech Republic) Natálie Taschlerová / Filip Taschler
- (Canada) Kaitlyn Weaver / Andrew Poje

In addition to his coaching career he has served as a choreographer. His clients include:

- (Italy) Sara Campanini / Francesco Riva
- (United States) Karen Chen
- (United States) Alysa Liu
- (United States) Nathan Chen
- (United States) Madison Chock / Evan Bates
- (Italy) Laura Finelli / Massimiliano Bucciarelli
- (United States) Isabella Flores / Ivan Desyatov
- (Philippines) Isabella Gamaz / Alexander Korovin
- (Germany) Darya Grimm / Michail Savitskiy
- (Japan) Wakaba Higuchi
- (Turkey) Nicole Kelly / Berk Akalın
- (Greece) Dimitra Korri
- (Poland) Ekaterina Kurakova
- (France) Natacha Lagouge / Arnaud Caffa
- (United States) Josephine Lee
- (Japan) Mai Mihara
- (United States) Leah Neset / Artem Markelov
- (Finland) Yuka Orihara / Juho Pirinen
- (Italy) Giulia Isabella Paolino / Andrea Tuba
- (Italy) Anna Pezzetta
- (Italy) Matteo Rizzo
- (Japan) Kaori Sakamoto
- (France) Lorine Schild
- (United States) Maia Shibutani / Alex Shibutani
- (Japan) Rion Sumiyoshi
- (Japan) Akiko Suzuki
- (Italy) Noemi Tali / Noah Lafornara
- (Japan) Keiji Tanaka
- (Japan) Tatsuya Tsuboi
- (Finland) Juulia Turkkila / Matthias Versluis
- (Japan) Utana Yoshida / Masaya Morita
- (Austria) Maurizio Zandron

== Programs ==
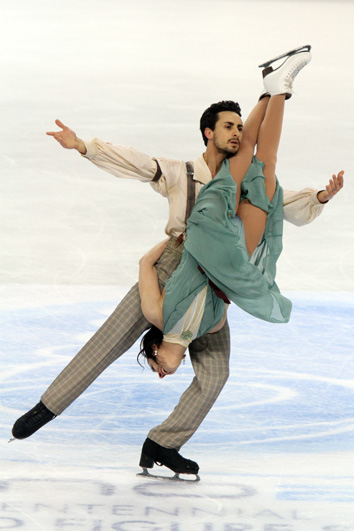
Faiella/Scali during their free dance at the 2010 Worlds

(with Faiella)

Season	Short dance	Free dance	Exhibition
2010–2011	My Fair Lady: "On the Street Where You Live" (instrumental); I could have danced all night; The rain in Spain	Manolete by Pepe Romero: Que se ven desde el conquero; De mi vera te fuistes	
	Original dance		
2009–2010	Italian folk: Tammurriata nera; Tarantella Pizzicata	Gli Emigranti by Nino Rota	Quel posto che non c'è by Negramaro
2008–2009	Follow the Fleet; Let's Face the Music and Dance; Let Yourself Go	Moonlight Sonata by Ludwig van Beethoven	By Missy Elliott: Past that Duch; The Rain; Lose Control
2007–2008	Pizzica Salentina; Lu Rusciu de lu Mare; Santo Poulo by Suono Salento	Yentl composed by Michel Legrand sung by Barbra Streisand	
2006–2007	Tanguera performed by Sexteto Mayor	Pantera en Liberta by Mónica Naranjo	Elisa
2005–2006	Cha Cha "Pata Pata"; Rhumba; Samba	The Mission by Ennio Morricone	The Mission; Carmina Burana; Elisa; La traviata
2004–2005	How Can I Live to Another Day by Frank Sinatra; Girls, Girls, Girls	By Aretha Franklin: Spirit in the Dark; (You Make Me Feel Like) A Natural Woman; Think	Ice Cube; Carmina Burana; Romanza by Andrea Bocelli
2003–2004	Hafanana by Afric Simone; Minnie the Moocher (from Blues Brothers soundtrack); Hafanana by Afric Simone	Libertango by Astor Piazzolla Orchestra disco soledad; Uno (from A Passion for Tango); Libertango by Astor Piazzolla Orchestra disco soledad	Big Spender
2002–2003	Die Fledermaus by Johann Strauss II	Ayer by Gloria Estefan; Demasiado by Willy Deville; Volveras by Gloria Estefan; Demasiado by Willy Deville	Big Spender
2001–2002	Scott & Fran's Paso Doble (from Strictly Ballroom OST) by David Hirschfelder & Bogo Pogo Orchestra; The Fencing Lesson by Marc Anthony; Scott & Fran's Paso Doble (from Strictly Ballroom OST) by David Hirschfelder & Bogo Pogo Orchestra	Four Seasons by Antonio Vivaldi performed by Boston Pops Orchestra	Por una cabeza

== Competitive highlights ==
=== With Faiella ===
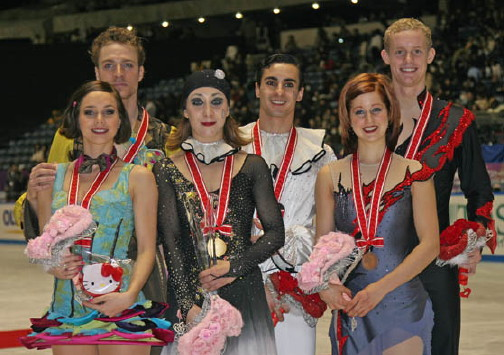
Faiella/Scali with their fellow medalists at the 2008 NHK Trophy

Results
International
Event	2001–02	2002–03	2003–04	2004–05	2005–06	2006–07	2007–08	2008–09	2009–10	2010–11
Olympics	18th				13th				5th	
Worlds	16th	11th	9th	9th	8th	9th	5th	8th	3rd	
Europeans	12th	8th	6th	5th	7th	6th	4th	2nd	2nd	5th
Grand Prix Final								4th		
GP Bompard				5th	3rd	3rd		2nd		
GP Cup of China					6th		3rd		3rd	3rd
GP Cup of Russia		5th	5th	3rd						WD
GP NHK Trophy								1st		
GP Skate America			4th				3rd			
GP Skate Canada	7th	5th				3rd				
Bofrost Cup			3rd							
Karl Schäfer	2nd									
Nebelhorn	2nd	1st								
National
Italian Champ.	2nd	1st	1st	1st	2nd	1st	1st	1st	1st	WD
GP = Grand Prix; WD = Withdrew

=== With Ottaviani ===
Results
International
Event	1996–1997	1997–1998	1998–1999	1999–2000
Junior Worlds	22nd		7th	4th
JGP Final		3rd	6th	5th
JGP Bulgaria			1st	
JGP China			1st	
JGP France		1st		
JGP Japan				1st
JGP Slovakia		1st		
JGP Slovenia				3rd
Autumn Trophy	10th J.			
National
Italian Champ.		2nd J.	2nd J.	1st J.
J. = Junior level; JGP = Junior Grand Prix
