= Phoria =

English art rock band

- Origin: Brighton, England
- Genres: Art pop; contemporary classical; art rock; indie rock; experimental rock; progressive rock; dream pop; electronic
- Years active: 2010–present
- Members: Trewin Howard; Ed Sanderson; Jeb Hardwick; Seryn Burden; James Cheeseman
- Past members: Ross Crick; Tim Douglas
- Website: phoriamusic.com

Phoria are an English art rock band based in Brighton, consisting of Trewin Howard, Ed Sanderson, Jeb Hardwick, James "Cheese" Cheeseman, and Seryn Burden.

Phoria released their debut EP, Yourself Still, in 2010, followed by Bloodworks (2013) and Display (2014). The records earned the band international critical and popular acclaim. The band's first full-length album, Volition, was released on 3 June 2016. Their second album, Caught a Black Rabbit, came out on 13 November 2020.

== History ==
Phoria members Trewin, Jeb and Ed went to primary school together in Salisbury, where they learned cello, classical guitar, and violin respectively. As friends, they spent their youth making music together before leaving for university in 2005. Jeb and Ed both attended the University of Southampton. Ed continued to study music, specialising in violin and piano. Jeb studied for a sociology degree, though spent much of his time experimenting with music and visual arts. Trewin attended the Dartington College of Arts in Devon. He had initially enrolled on as fine arts course but was soon drawn back to music. Having completed their studies, Trewin, Ed, and Jeb returned to Salisbury and took full-time jobs. Jeb's included a brief spell as an insurance agent. Ed, with a passion for acting, took large but unfulfilling parts in a series of niche-market films.

It was not long before the three of them realised that their future lay elsewhere, and moved to Brighton to start their musical careers. While studying at Southampton, Jeb and Ed had met Tim Douglas through a mutual friend. Following successful spells playing guitar in bands across the South West, Tim moved to Brighton to play bass, and complete the Phoria line-up along with then drummer, Ross Crick. Seryn Burden joined the band in August 2011, twelve months after the release of Yourself Still, following Ross's departure. In 2016, following the release of Volition, and a string of successful EPs and UK and international tours, Jeb Hardwick left Phoria to pursue a career in filmmaking. He was replaced by James Cheeseman. Jeb returned for the recording of the second album Caught A Black Rabbit (2020).

=== EPs (2010–2014) ===
The band's first EP Yourself Still was released in 2010 and earned positive reviews from various music blogs. The webzine TheSirensSound reviewed the EP, stating that '[Yourself Still]...carries various musical vibes from cinematic orchestra to post-rock and indie-rock to a stunning pop environment leading the overall outcome of this record to blazed emotion.' Describing Phoria as 'A band you definitely want to keep an eye on.'

Bloodworks was released through Akira Records in Spring 2013.

Lead single "Red" hit number 2 in The Hype Machine blog aggregator charts within only a few days, cementing the track as one of the standout singles of 2013 from a relatively unknown band. With the single released just days before the EP, ThisIsFakeDIY said of the track '[It gives] the impression that this here EP's going to be a game-changer. Glossy production is met midway by a startling, intimate style of songwriting, half Youth Lagoon, half something grander and more orchestral.'

Several tracks from the EP have been licensed to festival-featured European cinema, and Canadian television series Saving Hope.

Display was released in June 2014.

=== Volition (2016) ===
Volition was released in June 2016 following several delays. It received positive reviews across the critical sphere, with The 405 describing the album as 'gigantic...[yet] effortlessly intimate,' praising the 'cohesion in sound and vision'. Ben Yung of therevue.ca gave a glowing review, stating: 'Volition is stunning, an absolute emotional roller coaster from start to finish. It is easy to understand why it took two years for the Brighton-based five-piece to complete their debut, as every single detail has been given the utmost attention and the production is refined and masterful. Every note, every vocal component, every lyric, every instrumental texture has been attended to and nothing feels out of place. With the precision of a surgeon and the steely aim of an assassin, Phoria hits every mark, including piercing a hole through our hearts with their visceral and emotional electronica.'

The album was supported by festival appearances throughout 2016 and a UK and European tour.

In 2018, the song "Evolve" was featured in an episode of the Syfy original show, The Magicians. Tim Douglas left the band in 2019 citing 'personal reasons'. Saving Us A Riot was used in Season 3 of Killing Eve. It was announced Jeb Hardwick had rejoined the band in August 2019

=== Caught A Black Rabbit (2020) ===
In August 2019, photos were shared of the band recording at Abbey Road Studios. On 23 June the band shared the first track from the upcoming album, 'Intro'.

Their second album Caught A Black Rabbit was announced on Facebook, and is due for release on 13 November 2020. It has been described by the band as 'contemporary classical'. The first single from the album, 'Current' was premiered on Clash on 23 July. Trewin Howard said about the song, "We all have hidden depths, through which our vulnerable excitement flows... sometimes a storm will brew and the glassy surface that hides it all is disturbed," Circuit Sweet wrote ‘It’s a harrowing orchestration, a feeling of courage shines deep within this elegant track. This is such a beautiful and powerful release.’

== Style ==
Phoria draw on a range of musical genres to create their sound. In the days of Yourself Still, chordal guitar figures and often dense instrumentation drew comparisons to such bands as Radiohead, Sigur Rós, and Mew. The music blog therecommender.net, when reviewing preview material from the bands then forthcoming Bloodworks EP, wrote 'This...isn't just reminiscent of Radiohead, this is reminiscent of Radiohead at their best.' Martin Grech, Cinematic Orchestra, and Elbow are also major influences. The band have more recently been compared favourably to Aphex Twin, Autechre, and James Blake.

== Discography ==
- Yourself Still (EP) (2010)
- Bloodworks (EP) (2013)
- Display (EP) (2014)
- Volition (2016)
- Caught A Black Rabbit (2020)
- River Oblivion (2023)
