= Lindsay van Zundert =

Dutch figure skater

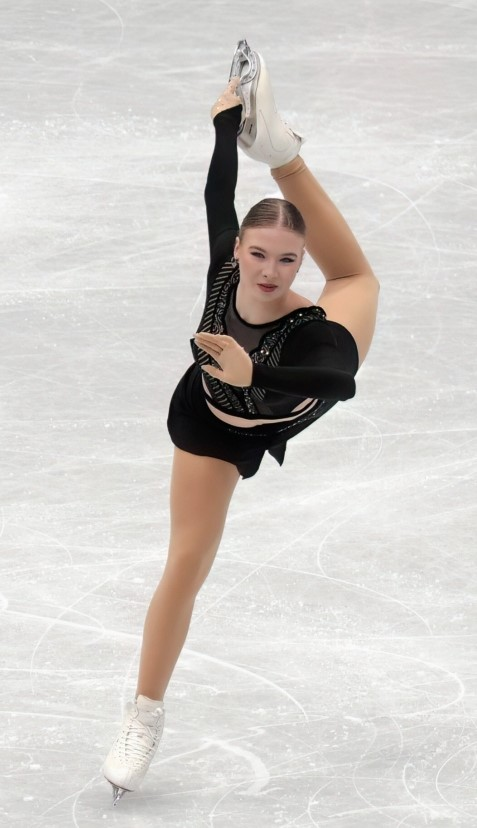
- Van Zundert at the 2022 World Championships

Personal information
- Born: 1 February 2005 (age 21) Etten-Leur, Netherlands

Figure skating career
- Country: Netherlands
- Discipline: Women's singles
- Retired: 2024

Medal record
Dutch Championships
Gold medal – first place	2022 Tilburg	Singles
Gold medal – first place	2023 Tilburg	Singles

Lindsay van Zundert (born 1 February 2005) is a retired Dutch figure skater. She is the 2021 Celje Open champion, the 2020 NRW Trophy champion, and a two-time Dutch national champion.

== Personal life ==
Van Zundert was born on 1 February 2005 in Etten-Leur. As of 2020, she was a mavo-4 student at Graaf Engelbrecht in Breda.

== Career ==
=== Early career ===
Van Zundert began skating at the age of seven. She competed at domestic Belgian competitions early in her career. In 2015, van Zundert began training under Ans Bocklandt in Courchevel, France and Wilrijk, Belgium.

Van Zundert is the 2017 and 2018 Dutch advanced novice national champion. She also won the 2019 Dutch junior national title, but was not sent to the 2019 World Junior Championships.

=== 2019–2020 season ===
Van Zundert attended several training seminars both abroad in Andorra, France, and the United States, as well as domestic ones sponsored by Joan Haanappel's Netherlands Figure Skating Foundation. She went door-to-door in Etten-Leur to collect donations and bottles to finance her trips.

Van Zundert made her Junior Grand Prix debut at 2019 JGP France, finishing 21st. Her result was insufficient to earn the Netherlands a spot at the 2020 Winter Youth Olympics. Van Zundert then finished sixth at the Tallinn Trophy. She won her first international medal, silver, at the Santa Claus Cup. After a fourth-place finish at the 2020 Bavarian Open, van Zundert was named to the 2020 World Junior Championships team. She defended her junior national title the following month. At Junior Worlds, van Zundert finished 29th in the short program and did not qualify to the final segment.

=== 2020–2021 season ===
Due to the cancellation of the Junior Grand Prix, van Zundert opened her season by making her senior international debut at the 2020 CS Nebelhorn Trophy, where she was the youngest competitor. She earned all personal bests to finish seventh overall. Her coach could not travel from Belgium, and she was accompanied by Lorenzo Magri, an Italian coach she knew from training. After the competition, she announced she was leaving her longtime coach, Ans Bocklandt, to train under Jorik Hendrickx and Carine Herrygers in Eindhoven and Tilburg. In November, van Zundert won her first international title at the 2020 NRW Trophy, ahead of Josefin Taljegård and Jenni Saarinen. Her results earned her the technical minimums for the 2021 European Championships. Van Zundert competed at several other Senior Bs throughout the season, winning medals at the Winter Star (silver) and Celje Open (gold).

Although the European Championships were eventually cancelled, van Zundert was able to earn her technical minimums at the 2021 Challenge Cup to earn a berth on the Dutch team for the 2021 World Championships in Stockholm. As the highest-ranked Dutch skater at Challenge Cup, she also earned her first senior national title. At the World Championships, she received a short program score of 57.72, which qualified her for the free skate in twenty-fourth position, the last skater to make the cut. In the free skate, she scored a new personal best of 116.78 and moved up to sixteenth position. Van Zundert's ranking qualified a berth for a Dutch skater at the 2022 Winter Olympics in Beijing. This was the first time the Netherlands had qualified in the Olympic ladies' event since Dianne de Leeuw in 1976. She remarked, "I have worked so hard for it, and I have given so much; it gives such a great feeling that I have achieved this."

=== 2021–2022 season ===
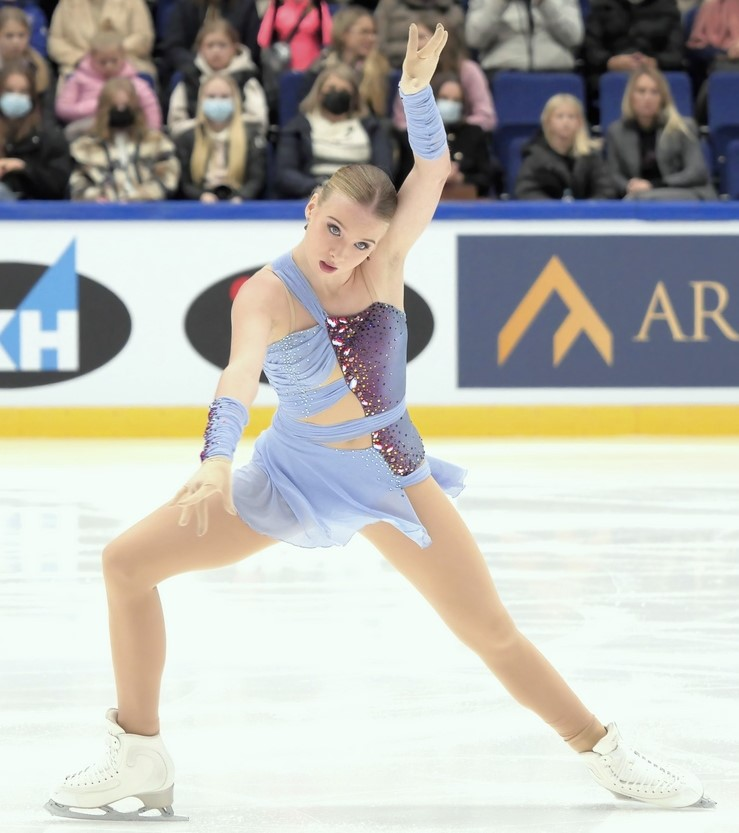
Lindsay van Zundert at the 2021 CS Finlandia Trophy

Van Zundert began the season at the 2021 CS Lombardia Trophy, where she placed seventh. She attempted a triple Lutz-triple toe loop combination in competition for the first time. She was eleventh at the 2021 CS Finlandia Trophy. She competed at the NRW Trophy in early November. She was second after the short program, won the free skate and placed first overall to win her second straight title at the event.

In late November, van Zundert was officially nominated to the Dutch Olympic team. In January, she was named co-flagbearer for the opening ceremony, alongside speed skater Kjeld Nuis. Shortly afterward she made her debut at the European Championships but had a disappointing outing when she failed to advance to the free skate and finished in twenty-seventh place. Coach Carine Herrygers opined, "she has put too much pressure on herself in recent weeks" and "in that respect, it has been a good lesson for the Games."

Competing in the 2022 Winter Olympics in the short program of the women's event, Van Zundert came twenty-second, qualifying for the free skate. Sixteenth in the free skate, she rose to eighteenth overall.

Following the Olympics, Van Zundert attended the 2022 Challenge Cup, which includes the Dutch national championships. She was tenth after the short program, 0.71 points clear of Niki Wories, her direct competition for the Dutch title. With a wider margin of 13.24 points in the free program, she retained the Dutch title while ending up seventh overall in the Challenge Cup. Van Zundert ended her season with a seventeenth place at the 2022 World Championships.

=== 2022–2023 season ===
In the aftermath of the Olympic season, Van Zundert would subsequently admit to struggling with motivation, saying "I had reached the highest level in competitions. I no longer had a goal in mind for myself." As well, she had difficulties with finding sponsors to continue funding her training.

Van Zundert began the season with a ninth placement at the 2022 CS Nebelhorn Trophy, and then was seventh at the 2022 CS Finlandia Trophy. To her surprise, she was invited to appear twice on the senior Grand Prix, making her debut at the 2022 Skate Canada International. Despite finishing eleventh of twelve skaters, she expressed satisfaction, saying it was a "huge learning experience to be here. Just to experience how such a match goes." She then finished eleventh once again at the 2022 Grand Prix de France, and then fifth at the 2022 CS Golden Spin of Zagreb.

At the 2023 European Championships, Van Zundert finished fourteenth. She expressed frustration with having fallen twice in the free skate and dropping out of the top ten. As a result, she opted to reduce her short program technical content going into the 2023 World Championships in Saitama, performing only a triple-double combination. She skated cleanly and finished nineteenth in the segment, qualifying to the free skate. She ultimately finished twenty-second.

=== 2023–2024 season ===
Van Zundert began the season with two Challenger assignments, placing sixth at the 2023 CS Nebelhorn Trophy and twentieth at the 2023 CS Budapest Trophy. In her lone Grand Prix appearance, she was twelfth at the 2023 NHK Trophy. She did not compete at the 2024 European Championships, citing personal circumstances that kept her from training enough. In February, she stated that she was still training occasionally while working in hospitality, and that while she still enjoyed skating, she was not yet sure if she would return to competition or not. She did not enter the 2024 World Championships.

In August, she announced her retirement at age 19. She cited a lack of energy to continue training as well as the 2024 deaths of fellow Dutch figure skaters Sjoukje Dijkstra and Joan Haanappel, with whom she had been friends. She also said that she intended to become a figure skating coach.

== Programs ==
Season	Short program	Free skating
2023–2024	Can't Help Falling in Love performed by Tommee Profitt and Brooke choreo. by Benoît Richaud	Pirates of the Caribbean: Hoist the Colours by Hans Zimmer; The Pirate That Should Not Be by Photek, Rodrigo y Gabriela; One Day by Hans Zimmer; Hoist the Colours by Hans Zimmer and Samuel Kim choreo. by Benoît Richaud
2022–2023	Pas sans toi by Lara Fabian arranged by Cedric Tour choreo. by Benoît Richaud	Pirates of the Caribbean: Hoist the Colours by Hans Zimmer; The Pirate That Should Not Be by Photek, Rodrigo y Gabriela; One Day by Hans Zimmer; Hoist the Colours by Hans Zimmer and Samuel Kim choreo. by Benoît Richaud
2021–2022	11 Past the Hour by Imelda May arranged by Cedric Tour choreo. by Benoît Richaud	Le Discours d'Arthur; Urgence by Jerome Rebotier; Lay It On by Jerome Rebotier, Jul Peciers, Rover choreo. by Benoît Richaud
2020–2021	Alegría (from Cirque du Soleil) by René Dupéré choreo. by Benoît Richaud	Tanguera by Diego Schissi Quinteto; Come What May (from Moulin Rouge!) by David Baerwald, Kevin Gilbert choreo. by Ans Bocklandt
2019–2020	Writing's on the Wall by Sam Smith performed by Sofia Karlberg choreo. by Benoît Richaud	Spartacus by Aram Khachaturian choreo. by Ans Bocklandt

== Competitive highlights ==
- GP – Event of the ISU Grand Prix Series
- JGP – Event of the ISU Junior Grand Prix Series
- CS – Event of the ISU Challenger Series

Competition placements at senior level
Season	2020–21	2021–22	2022–23	2023–24
Winter Olympics		17th		
World Championships	16th	17th	22nd	
European Championships		26th	14th	
Dutch Championships		1st	1st	
GP France			11th	
GP NHK Trophy				12th
GP Skate Canada			11th	
CS Budapest Trophy				20th
CS Finlandia Trophy		11th	7th	
CS Golden Spin of Zagreb			5th	
CS Lombardia Trophy		7th		
CS Nebelhorn Trophy	7th		9th	6th
Celje Open	1st			
Challenge Cup	6th	7th	5th	
NRW Trophy	1st	1st		
Tirnavia Ice Cup				4th
Winter Star	2nd			

Competition placements at junior level
Season	2018–19	2019–20
World Junior Championships		29th
Dutch Championships	1st	1st
JGP France		21st
Bavarian Open	7th	4th
Challenge Cup	5th	9th
Coupe du Printemps	6th	
Christmas Cup	8th	
Prague Ice Cup	12th	
Santa Claus Cup		2nd
Tallinn Trophy		6th

== Detailed results ==
ISU personal best scores in the +5/-5 GOE System
Segment	Type	Score	Event
Total	TSS	175.81	2022 Winter Olympics
Short program	TSS	59.24	2022 Winter Olympics
Short program	TES	33.06	2021 CS Lombardia Trophy
Short program	PCS	27.99	2022 CS Golden Spin of Zagreb
Free skating	TSS	116.78	2021 World Championships
Free skating	TES	64.74	2021 World Championships
Free skating	PCS	57.13	2022 CS Golden Spin of Zagreb

=== Senior level ===
2023–2024 season
Date	Event	SP	FS	Total
24–26 November 2023	2023 NHK Trophy	12; 43.46	12; 82.36	12; 125.82
27-29 October 2023	2023 Tirnavia Ice Cup	4; 43.80	4; 101.60	4; 155.40
13-15 October 2023	2023 CS Budapest Trophy	26; 40.92	14; 94.32	20; 135.24
20–23 September 2023	2023 CS Nebelhorn Trophy	4; 58.96	8; 103.56	6; 162.52
2022–23 season
Date	Event	SP	FS	Total
22–26 March 2023	2023 World Championships	19; 57.56	22; 101.99	22; 159.55
23–26 February 2023	2023 International Challenge Cup	8; 58.03	6; 118.81	5; 176.84
25–29 January 2023	2023 European Championships	10; 58.13	15; 99.97	14; 158.10
7–10 December 2022	2022 CS Golden Spin of Zagreb	3; 58.66	5; 116.15	5; 174.81
4–6 November 2022	2022 Grand Prix de France	11; 55.11	11; 98.98	11; 154.09
28–30 October 2022	2022 Skate Canada International	9; 55.22	10; 105.74	11; 160.96
5–9 October 2022	2022 CS Finlandia Trophy	6; 59.22	8; 105.59	7; 164.81
21–24 September 2022	2022 CS Nebelhorn Trophy	8; 53.11	8; 101.20	9; 154.31
2021–22 season
Date	Event	SP	FS	Total
21–27 March 2022	2022 World Championships	18; 58.49	17; 112.90	17; 171.39
24–27 February 2022	2022 International Challenge Cup	10; 51.14	7; 99.83	7; 150.97
15–17 February 2022	2022 Winter Olympics	21; 59.24	15; 116.57	17; 175.81
10–16 January 2022	2022 European Championships	27; 48.92	–	27; 48.92
18–21 November 2021	2021 CS Warsaw Cup	6; 79.34	12; 134.42	7; 213.76
4–7 November 2021	2021 NRW Trophy	2; 58.72	1; 111.19	1; 169.91
7–10 October 2021	2021 CS Finlandia Trophy	15; 57.04	11; 114.36	11; 171.40
10–12 September 2021	2021 CS Lombardia Trophy	6; 57.90	8; 105.46	7; 163.36
2020–21 season
Date	Event	SP	FS	Total
22–28 March 2021	2021 World Championships	24; 57.72	15; 116.78	16; 174.50
26–28 February 2021	2021 International Challenge Cup	4; 59.01	6; 101.99	6; 161.00
12–14 February 2021	2021 Celje Open	5; 52.58	1; 111.85	1; 164.43
11–12 December 2020	2020 Winter Star	2; 56.06	2; 103.77	2; 159.83
26–29 November 2020	2020 NRW Trophy	4; 53.05	1; 113.87	1; 166.92
23–26 September 2020	2020 CS Nebelhorn Trophy	7; 51.65	10; 90.28	7; 141.93

=== Junior level ===
2019–20 season
Date	Event	SP	FS	Total
2–8 March 2020	2020 World Junior Championships	29; 48.21	–	29; 48.21
20–23 February 2020	2020 International Challenge Cup	9; 48.89	10; 81.96	9; 130.85
3–9 February 2020	2020 Bavarian Open	5; 52.02	4; 99.06	4; 151.08
11–17 November 2019	2019 Tallinn Trophy	5; 45.31	5; 79.08	6; 124.39
2–8 December 2019	2019 Santa Claus Cup	1; 51.64	3; 84.14	2; 135.78
21–24 August 2019	2019 JGP France	17; 46.33	22; 80.18	21; 126.51
2018–19 season
Date	Event	SP	FS	Total
15–17 March 2019	2019 Coupe du Printemps	8; 37.97	6; 76.05	6; 114.02
21–24 February 2019	2019 International Challenge Cup	5; 41.93	5; 75.16	5; 117.09
5–10 February 2019	2019 Bavarian Open	14; 38.83	5; 84.49	7; 123.32
29 November–2 December 2018	2018 Christmas Cup	6; 43.31	8; 78.05	8; 121.36
9–11 November 2018	2018 Prague Ice Cup	10; 39.75	9; 76.11	12; 115.86
