= 2021 CS Finlandia Trophy =

- Type: ISU Challenger Series
- Date: October 7 – 10
- Season: 2021–22
- Location: Espoo, Finland
- Host: Suomen Taitoluisteluliitto
- Venue: Espoo Metro Areena

Champions
- Men's singles: (United States) Jason Brown
- Women's singles: (Russia) Kamila Valieva
- Pairs: (Russia) Anastasia Mishina / Aleksandr Galliamov
- Ice dance: (France) Gabriella Papadakis / Guillaume Cizeron
- Previous: 2019 CS Finlandia Trophy
- Next: 2022 CS Finlandia Trophy
- Previous CS: 2021 CS Nebelhorn Trophy
- Next CS: 2021 CS Denis Ten Memorial Challenge

The 2021 CS Finlandia Trophy was held on October 7–10, 2021 in Espoo, Finland. It was part of the 2021–22 ISU Challenger Series. Medals were awarded in the disciplines of men's singles, women's singles, pairs, and ice dance.

After the previous Challenger Series event, the Nepela Memorial, was cancelled, the event organizers received a higher-than-anticipated interest number of entries. As a result, the competition was extended one day to begin on Thursday, October 7, rather than the original Friday, October 8 start date.

== Entries ==
The International Skating Union published the list of entries on September 14, 2021.

Country	Men	Women	Pairs	Ice dance
Australia	Brendan Kerry; James Min	Victoria Alcantara; Kailani Craine		Holly Harris / Jason Chan; Chantelle Kerry / Andrew Dodds
Austria	Luc Maierhofer			
Belarus	Konstantin Milyukov	Viktoriia Safonova	Bogdana Lukashevich / Alexander Stepanov	
Belgium		Loena Hendrickx		
Bulgaria		Kristina Grigorova		
Canada	Keegan Messing	Madeline Schizas	Vanessa James / Eric Radford; Kirsten Moore-Towers / Michael Marinaro	Marjorie Lajoie / Zachary Lagha; Carolane Soucisse / Shane Firus
Chile		Yae-Mia Neira		
Czech Republic	Matyáš Bělohradský		Elizaveta Zhuk / Martin Bidař	
Denmark		Maia Sørensen		
Estonia	Arlet Levandi	Eva-Lotta Kiibus; Nataly Langerbaur		Aleksandra Samersova / Kevin Ojala
Finland	Makar Suntsev; Valtter Virtanen	Linnea Ceder; Laura Karhunen; Oona Ounasvuori; Jenni Saarinen	Milania Väänänen / Mikhail Akulov	Yuka Orihara / Juho Pirinen; Juulia Turkkila / Matthias Versluis
France	Luc Economides			Gabriella Papadakis / Guillaume Cizeron
Georgia		Anastasiia Gubanova		
Germany	Nikita Starostin	Nicole Schott	Minerva Fabienne Hase / Nolan Seegert; Annika Hocke / Robert Kunkel	Jennifer Janse van Rensburg / Benjamin Steffan; Katharina Müller / Tim Dieck
Great Britain		Natasha McKay; Karly Robertson	Anastasia Vaipan-Law / Luke Digby	Lilah Fear / Lewis Gibson
Iceland		Aldís Kara Bergsdóttir		
Italy	Gabriele Frangipani; Matteo Rizzo			
Lithuania				Paulina Ramanauskaitė / Deividas Kizala
Mexico	Donovan Carrillo			
Netherlands		Lindsay van Zundert	Nika Osipova / Dmitry Epstein	Chelsea Verhaegh / Sherim van Geffen
Philippines	Christopher Caluza; Michael Christian Martinez	Sofia Frank		
Russia	Dmitri Aliev; Mikhail Kolyada; Evgeni Semenenko	Alena Kostornaia; Elizaveta Tuktamysheva; Kamila Valieva	Anastasia Mishina / Aleksandr Galliamov; Evgenia Tarasova / Vladimir Morozov	
Spain	Tomás Llorenç Guarino Sabaté		Laura Barquero / Marco Zandron; Dorota Broda / Pedro Betegón Martín	Sara Hurtado / Kirill Khaliavin; Olivia Smart / Adrián Díaz
Sweden	Nikolaj Majorov	Josefin Taljegård		
Switzerland	Lukas Britschgi; Nurullah Sahaka; Micha Steffen	Livia Kaiser		
United States	Jason Brown; Camden Pulkinen	Karen Chen; Amber Glenn	Ashley Cain-Gribble / Timothy LeDuc; Jessica Calalang / Brian Johnson	Christina Carreira / Anthony Ponomarenko; Madison Chock / Evan Bates

=== Changes to preliminary assignments ===
Date	Discipline	Withdrew	Added	Reason/Other notes	Refs
September 17	Women	(South Korea) Lee Hae-in	(Chile) Yae-Mia Neira		
September 17	Ice dance	(Germany) Lara Luft / Maximilian Pfisterer	(Germany) Jennifer Janse van Rensburg / Benjamin Steffan		
September 21	Pairs	(Italy) Rebecca Ghilardi / Filippo Ambrosini			
September 22	Women	N/A	(Finland) Linnea Ceder		
September 23	Men	(Russia) Andrei Mozalev	(Russia) Dmitri Aliev		
September 23	Ice dance	(Poland) Anastasia Polibina / Pavel Golovishnikov			
September 23	Ice dance	(Russia) Sofia Shevchenko / Igor Eremenko			
September 24	Pairs	(Russia) Aleksandra Boikova / Dmitrii Kozlovskii	(Russia) Evgenia Tarasova / Vladimir Morozov		
September 27	Men	(Estonia) Aleksandr Selevko			
September 27	Women	(Greece) Dimitra Korri	(Belgium) Loena Hendrickx		
September 29	Men	(Germany) Paul Fentz			
September 29	Men	(United States) Maxim Naumov			
September 29	Women	(Sweden) Matilda Algotsson			
September 29	Pairs	(Italy) Sara Conti / Niccolò Macii			
September 30	Men	N/A	(United States) Camden Pulkinen		
October 4	Women	(Estonia) Kristina Škuleta-Gromova	(Estonia) Nataly Langerbaur		
October 5	Ice dance	(France) Evgeniia Lopareva / Geoffrey Brissaud			
October 5	Ice dance	(Russia) Alexandra Stepanova / Ivan Bukin		Lack of preparation time after illness	
October 6	Women	(Germany) Nathalie Weinzierl			
October 7	Women	(Finland) Emmi Peltonen	(Finland) Laura Karhunen		

== Records ==
The following new ISU best scores were set during this competition:

Discipline	Component	Skater(s)	Score	Date	Ref
Women	Free skating	(Russia) Kamila Valieva	174.31	October 10, 2021	
Women	Total score	(Russia) Kamila Valieva	249.24	October 10, 2021	

== Results ==
=== Men ===
Rank	Name	Nation	Total points	SP		FS	
1	Jason Brown	United States	262.52	2	92.39	5	170.13
2	Mikhail Kolyada	Russia	256.98	3	82.75	2	174.23
3	Dmitri Aliev	Russia	249.25	5	78.28	4	170.97
4	Keegan Messing	Canada	242.58	1	92.39	7	150.19
5	Evgeni Semenenko	Russia	242.23	11	69.63	3	172.60
6	Matteo Rizzo	Italy	238.75	19	62.57	1	176.18
7	Arlet Levandi	Estonia	222.61	9	70.14	6	152.47
8	Lukas Britschgi	Switzerland	211.09	15	65.28	8	145.81
9	Tomás Llorenç Guarino Sabaté	Spain	210.36	10	70.13	9	140.23
10	Gabriele Frangipani	Italy	209.25	7	73.37	12	135.88
11	Luc Economides	France	207.69	12	68.99	10	138.70
12	Nikita Starostin	Germany	205.60	8	70.20	13	135.40
13	Brendan Kerry	Australia	204.75	13	66.13	11	138.62
14	Camden Pulkinen	United States	204.24	6	75.51	15	128.73
15	Donovan Carrillo	Mexico	192.54	21	61.06	14	131.48
16	Matyáš Bělohradský	Czech Republic	188.89	16	64.83	16	124.06
17	Nikolaj Majorov	Sweden	188.83	4	81.48	22	107.35
18	Luc Maierhofer	Austria	183.10	18	63.99	17	119.11
19	Valtter Virtanen	Finland	179.75	14	65.74	19	114.01
20	Konstantin Milyukov	Belarus	177.67	20	62.43	18	115.24
21	Nurullah Sahaka	Switzerland	176.85	17	64.28	20	112.57
22	Makar Suntsev	Finland	158.82	26	50.73	21	108.09
23	James Min	Australia	157.73	24	55.39	23	102.34
24	Michael Christian Martinez	Philippines	156.78	23	55.62	24	101.16
25	Christopher Caluza	Philippines	156.24	22	59.74	26	96.50
26	Micha Steffan	Switzerland	151.67	25	54.88	25	96.79

=== Women ===
Rank	Name	Nation	Total points	SP		FS	
1	Kamila Valieva	Russia	249.24	3	74.93	1	174.31
2	Elizaveta Tuktamysheva	Russia	233.30	1	81.53	2	151.77
3	Alena Kostornaia	Russia	218.83	2	78.61	4	140.22
4	Loena Hendrickx	Belgium	212.07	5	68.82	3	143.25
5	Anastasiia Gubanova	Georgia	203.91	4	69.50	7	134.41
6	Karen Chen	United States	202.49	6	67.50	6	134.99
7	Eva-Lotta Kiibus	Estonia	202.04	8	64.53	5	137.51
8	Viktoriia Safonova	Belarus	187.83	9	64.26	9	123.57
9	Madeline Schizas	Canada	184.73	12	59.29	8	125.44
10	Amber Glenn	United States	183.46	10	60.76	10	122.70
11	Lindsay van Zundert	Netherlands	171.40	15	57.04	11	114.36
12	Jenni Saarinen	Finland	168.72	7	67.05	16	101.67
13	Josefin Taljegård	Sweden	164.56	17	56.36	13	108.20
14	Oona Ounasvuori	Finland	162.68	21	49.30	12	113.55
15	Natasha McKay	Great Britain	162.54	14	57.26	14	105.28
16	Kailani Craine	Australia	161.59	13	58.02	15	103.57
17	Nicole Schott	Germany	161.23	11	60.25	17	100.98
18	Sofia Frank	Philippines	148.09	18	53.30	18	94.79
19	Livia Kaiser	Switzerland	144.14	20	49.52	19	94.62
20	Victoria Alcantara	Australia	140.78	22	48.01	20	92.77
21	Laura Karhunen	Finland	137.15	16	56.82	22	80.33
22	Nataly Langerbaur	Estonia	127.70	25	43.13	21	84.57
23	Aldís Kara Bergsdóttir	Iceland	122.11	23	45.45	23	76.66
24	Yae-Mia Neira	Chile	118.44	26	42.80	24	75.64
25	Karly Robertson	Great Britain	117.31	19	51.83	26	65.48
26	Kristina Grigorova	Bulgaria	112.88	27	40.83	25	72.05
WD	Linnea Ceder	Finland	withdrew	24	44.72	withdrew from competition	
WD	Maia Sørensen	Denmark	withdrew	withdrew from competition			

=== Pairs ===
Rank	Name	Nation	Total points	SP		FS	
1	Anastasia Mishina / Aleksandr Galliamov	Russia	227.13	2	73.76	1	153.37
2	Evgenia Tarasova / Vladimir Morozov	Russia	213.72	1	78.33	2	135.39
3	Ashley Cain-Gribble / Timothy LeDuc	United States	193.00	6	64.98	3	128.02
4	Jessica Calalang / Brian Johnson	United States	191.89	7	64.13	4	127.76
5	Vanessa James / Eric Radford	Canada	190.58	3	67.55	7	123.03
6	Laura Barquero / Marco Zandron	Spain	189.99	4	65.33	5	124.66
7	Minerva Fabienne Hase / Nolan Seegert	Germany	188.37	5	65.19	6	123.18
8	Kirsten Moore-Towers / Michael Marinaro	Canada	184.37	8	61.60	8	122.77
9	Elizaveta Zhuk / Martin Bidař	Czech Republic	142.26	9	48.36	10	93.90
10	Bogdana Lukashevich / Alexander Stepanov	Belarus	140.84	14	43.88	9	96.96
11	Annika Hocke / Robert Kunkel	Germany	138.82	11	47.72	11	91.10
12	Anastasia Vaipan-Law / Luke Digby	Great Britain	132.56	13	45.79	12	86.77
13	Dorota Broda / Pedro Betegón Martín	Spain	130.25	10	47.94	14	82.31
14	Milania Väänänen / Mikhail Akulov	Finland	120.73	15	38.01	13	82.72
15	Nika Osipova / Dmitry Epstein	Netherlands	119.00	12	46.29	15	72.71

=== Ice dance ===
Rank	Name	Nation	Total points	RD		FD	
1	Gabriella Papadakis / Guillaume Cizeron	France	217.54	1	85.58	1	131.96
2	Madison Chock / Evan Bates	United States	208.31	2	83.72	2	124.59
3	Lilah Fear / Lewis Gibson	Great Britain	190.39	4	74.78	3	115.61
4	Olivia Smart / Adrián Díaz	Spain	185.82	5	72.67	5	113.15
5	Sara Hurtado / Kirill Khaliavin	Spain	185.57	3	74.79	6	110.78
6	Juulia Turkkila / Matthias Versluis	Finland	185.19	8	71.92	4	113.27
7	Marjorie Lajoie / Zachary Lagha	Canada	181.03	7	71.93	7	109.10
8	Christina Carreira / Anthony Ponomarenko	United States	178.27	6	72.36	8	105.91
9	Katharina Müller / Tim Dieck	Germany	171.08	9	68.35	9	102.73
10	Jennifer Janse van Rensburg / Benjamin Steffan	Germany	165.22	10	65.64	11	99.58
11	Carolane Soucisse / Shane Firus	Canada	162.95	14	60.23	10	102.72
12	Yuka Orihara / Juho Pirinen	Finland	158.51	13	61.18	12	97.33
13	Holly Harris / Jason Chan	Australia	155.70	11	61.62	13	94.08
14	Chantelle Kerry / Andrew Dodds	Australia	154.46	12	61.36	14	93.10
15	Paulina Ramanauskaitė / Deividas Kizala	Lithuania	125.79	15	52.87	15	72.92
16	Aleksandra Samersova / Kevin Ojala	Estonia	120.10	16	50.26	16	69.84
17	Chelsea Verhaegh / Sherim van Geffen	Netherlands	113.24	17	45.35	17	67.89
