= Nikita Starostin =

Russian-German figure skater (born 2002)

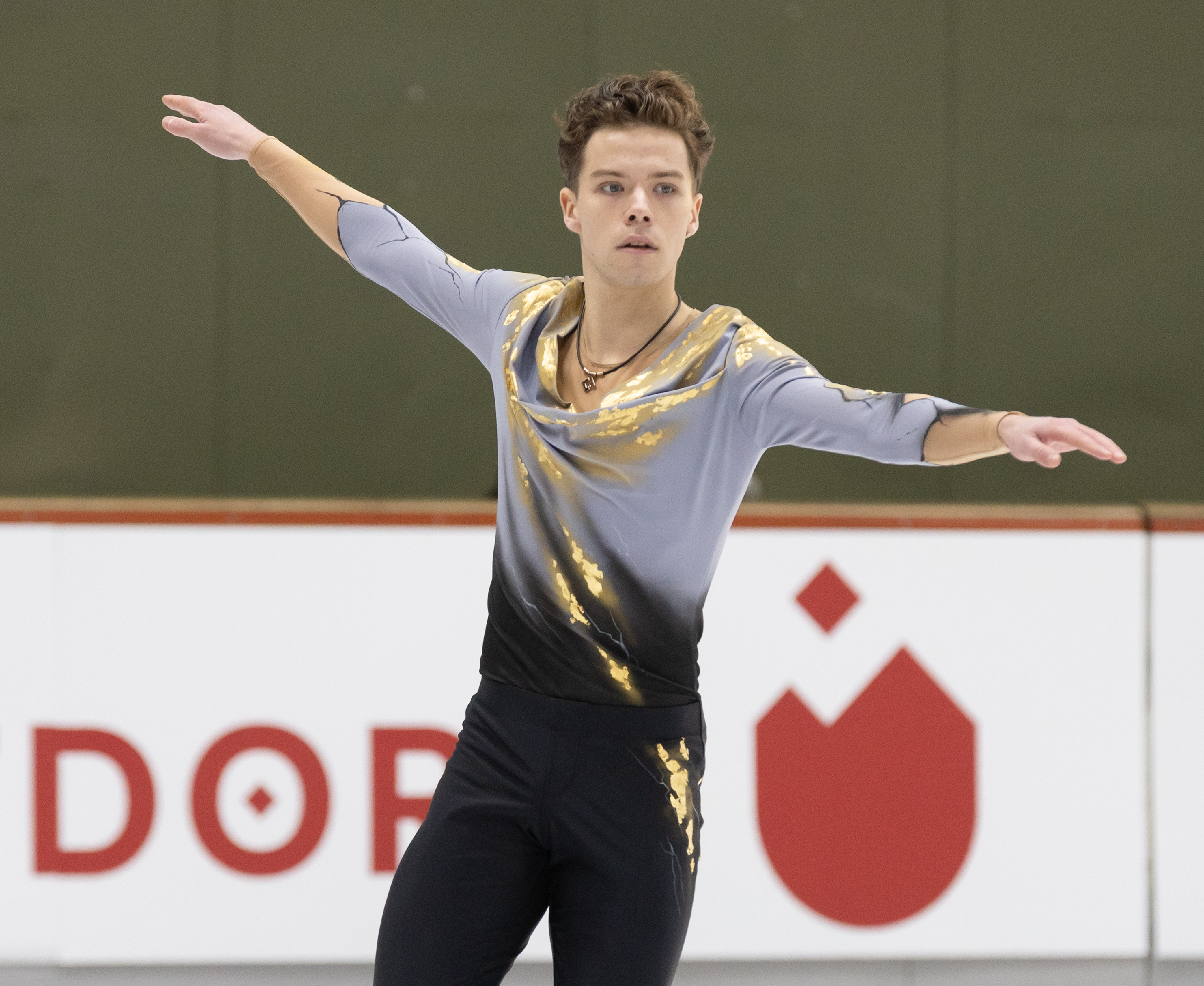
- Nikita Starostin in 2025

Personal information
- Native name: Никита Максимович Старостин (Russian)
- Full name: Nikita Maximovich Starostin
- Born: 13 June 2002 (age 24) Saint Petersburg, Russia
- Home town: Pressath, Germany & Antwerp, Belgium
- Height: 1.68 m (5 ft 6 in)

Figure skating career
- Country: Germany (since 2018); Russia (2016–17)
- Discipline: Men's singles
- Coach: Adam Solya; Jorik Hendrickx; Evgeni Rukavicin
- Skating club: ERC Westfalen
- Began skating: 2009

Medal record
Representing Germany
German Championships
Gold medal – first place	2023 Oberstdorf	Singles
Gold medal – first place	2025 Oberstdorf	Singles
Silver medal – second place	2024 Berlin	Singles
Silver medal – second place	2026 Oberstdorf	Singles
Bronze medal – third place	2022 Neuss	Singles

Nikita Maximovich Starostin (Russian: Никита Максимович Старостин; born 13 June 2002) is a Russian-German figure skater, who represents Germany internationally.

He is a two-time German national champion (2023, 2025) and a two-time ISU Challenger Series bronze medalist.

== Personal life ==
Starostin was born on 13 June 2002 in Saint Petersburg, Russia. Prior to becoming a figure skater, Starostin also participated in swimming and football as a child. Starostin's stepfather is German, which factored into his decision to represent Germany. His figure skating idols are Deniss Vasiljevs and Shoma Uno.

Starostin obtained German citizenship on 23 December 2024.

== Career ==
=== Early career ===
Starostin began figure skating in 2009 after being encouraged by his mother, a former figure skater, to give it a try. According to Starostin, it was difficult for him to initially find someone to coach him in Russia due to him only having started skating at seven years old. Eventually though, Starostin was able to train in a group coached by Alexei Mishin and soon, Svetlana Knorr became his coach.

Representing Russia, he won the bronze medal on the junior level at the 2016 Tallinn Trophy.

In 2018, Starostin would ultimately decide to represent Germany.

=== 2018–19 season: Debut for Germany ===
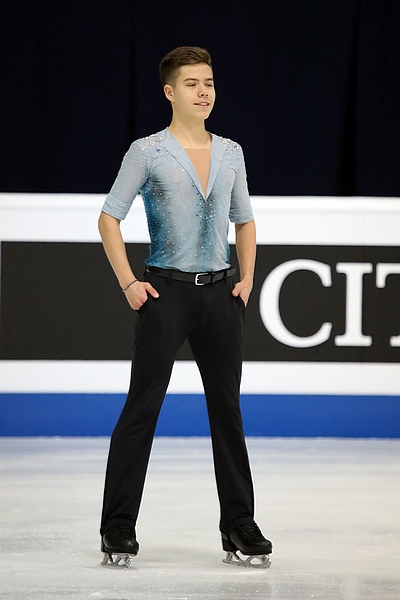
Starostin at the 2019 World Junior Championships

Prior to the season, Starostin moved to Valmiera, Latvia to be coached by Julia Kulibanova. He would begin his season by winning gold at the 2018 NRW Trophy. He made his international debut on the 2018–19 Junior Grand Prix series, placing twelfth at 2018 JGP Slovenia. He then won bronze at both the 2018 Alpen Trophy and the 2018 Tallinn Trophy.

At the 2019 German Junior Championships, Starostin placed seventh. Starostin went on to finish fourth at the 2019 Mentor Toruń Cup and fifth at the 2019 Bavarian Open.

He ended his season with a twenty-fourth place finish at the 2019 Junior World Championships in Sofia, Bulgaria.

=== 2019–20 season ===
Starostin started his season with a sixteenth-place finish at the 2019 JGP Russia. He went on to win the 2019 Santa Claus Cup.

At the 2020 German Junior Championships, Starostin won the silver medal. He closed the season with a fifth-place finish at the 2020 Bavarian Open.

Following the season, Starostin left coach, Julia Kulibanova, and began working with Adam Solya in Eindhoven, Netherlands. In 2023, Starostin said that he credits Solya for having always believed in him, stating, "He saw a talent in me that others didn't. We started working together and I decided to move to live in Europe. It turned out to be the right idea – I felt that I had no future in Russia. People didn't believe that I could do more People didn't believe that I could do more. And Adam knows that I can do more."

=== 2020–21 season ===
Starostin was unable to compete internationally this season due to the COVID-19 pandemic.

=== 2021–22 season: Senior international debut ===
Prior to the season, Starostin relocated to Belgium to train and in addition to Adam Solya, Jorik Hendrickx became one of his coaches. He began the season with twelfth-place finishes at the 2021 CS Lombardia Trophy and the 2021 CS Finlandia Trophy. He went on to finish eighth at the 2021 CS Cup of Austria and win bronze at the 2021 NRW Trophy.

At the 2022 German Championships, Starostin won the bronze medal behind Paul Fentz and Kai Jagoda. He was ultimately selected to compete at the 2022 European Championships in Tallinn, Estonia and the 2022 World Championships in Montpellier, France.

Starostin then competed at the 2022 International Challenge Cup, placing seventh. At the European Championships, Starostin placed thirteenth after placing fourteenth in the short program and twelfth in the free skate. Debuting at the World Championships, Starostin placed twenty-third in the short program and twenty-second in the free skate, finishing twenty-second overall.

=== 2022–23 season: German national title ===
Starostin began the season with three assignments on the Challenger series, finishing ninth at the 2022 CS Nebelhorn Trophy, fifteenth at the 2022 CS Finlandia Trophy, and winning the bronze medal at the 2022 CS Ice Challenge. He later won gold at the 2022 NRW Trophy, and placed sixth at the 2022 Santa Claus Cup.

At the 2023 German Championships, Starostin won his first national title. He went on to compete at the 2023 European Championships in Espoo, Finland where he placed tenth in the short program and seventeenth in the free skate, finishing in fifteenth place overall.

At the 2023 World Championships in Saitama, Japan, Starostin finished in nineteenth place overall after placing sixteenth in the short program and nineteenth in the free skate.

=== 2023–24 season ===
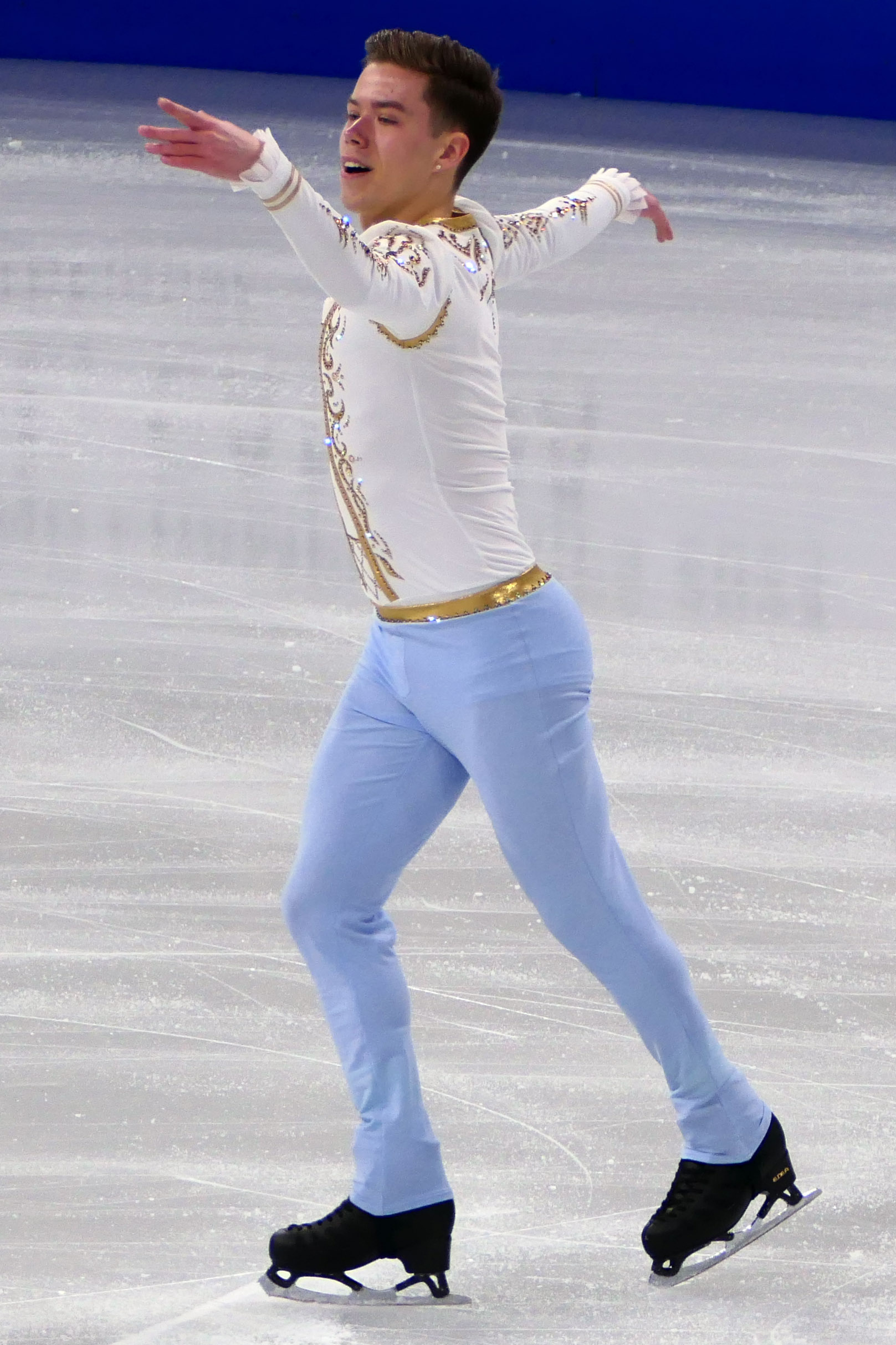
Starostin performing his short program at the 2024 World Championships

Starostin started the season by finishing sixth at the 2023 CS Lombardia Trophy. In his second Challenger appearance, he was ninth at the 2023 CS Finlandia Trophy. He then made a third Challenger appearance, coming seventh at the 2023 CS Denis Ten Memorial Challenge. Starostin was invited to make his Grand Prix debut at the 2023 Grand Prix of Espoo, placing seventh.

He went on to win silver at the 2024 German Championships behind Kai Jagoda. Selected to compete at the 2024 European Championships in Kaunas, Lithuania, Starostin finished thirteenth. He went on to compete at the 2024 Challenge Cup, where he placed fourth.

At the 2024 World Championships in Montreal, Quebec, Canada, Starostin placed thirty-second in the short program, failing to advance to the free skate. Despite the setback, Starostin later said he was "channeling his disappointment into determination during the off-season."

=== 2024–25 season ===
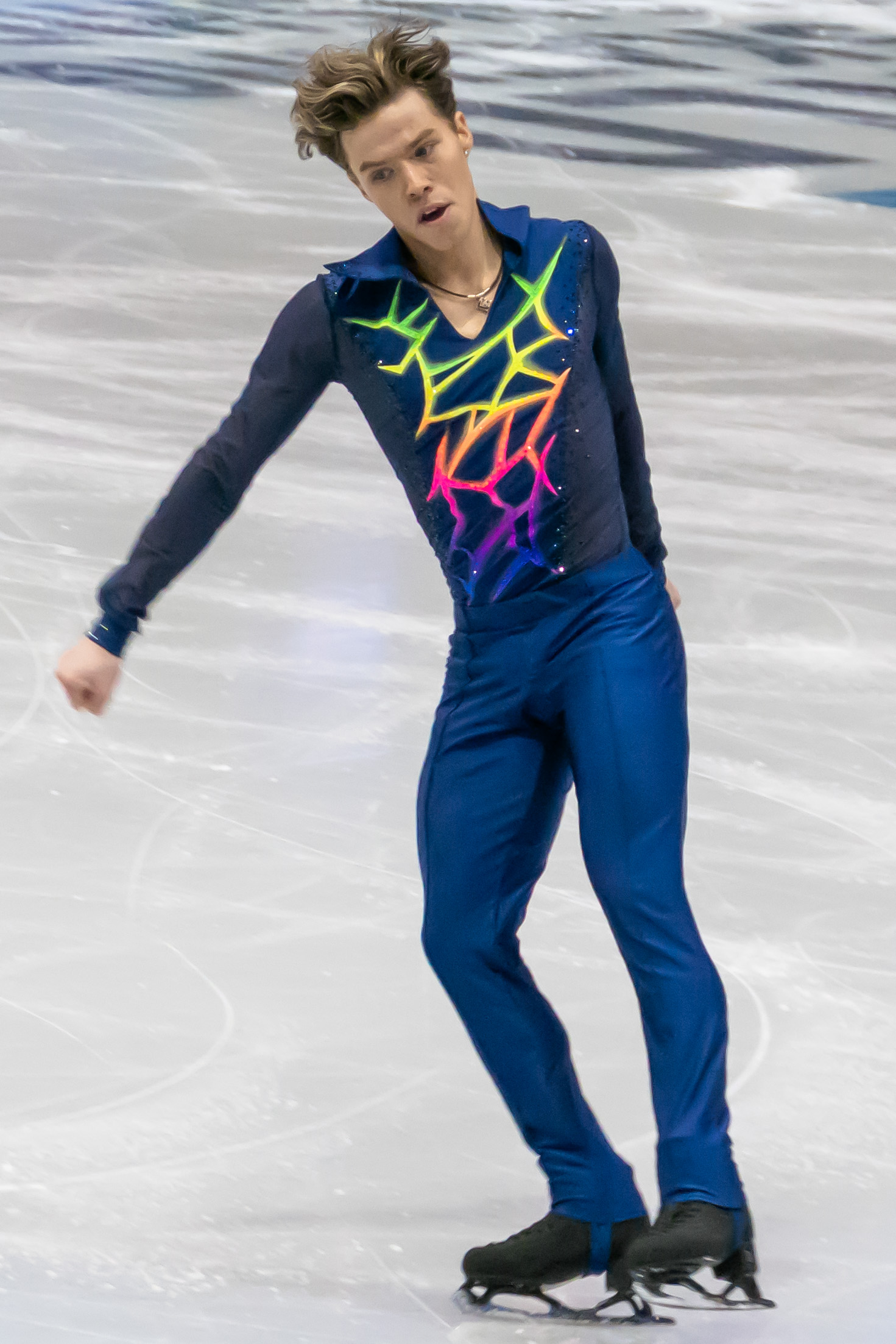
Starostin performing his short program at the 2025 World Championships

Beginning his season by competing on the 2024–25 ISU Challenger Series, Starostin finished sixteenth finish at the 2024 CS Nebelhorn Trophy, winning bronze at the 2024 CS Budapest Trophy, and finishing fourth at the 2024 CS Tallinn Trophy. Between the latter two events, he also finished eighth at the 2024 Volvo Open Cup.

Going on to compete at the 2025 German Championships, Starostin won the national title for a second time. The following month, he competed at the 2025 European Championships in Tallinn, Estonia. He placed twenty-seventh in the short program and did not advance to the free skate segment. Starostin followed this up with a ninth-place finish at the Road to 26 Trophy, a test event for the 2026 Winter Olympics.

In March, he competed at the 2025 World Championships, held in Boston, Massachusetts, United States. He put a hand down on one jump during his short program, and he finished in twenty-eighth place and did not advance to the free skate segment.

=== 2025–26 season ===
Starostin opened the season by competing on the 2025–26 ISU Challenger Series, finishing fourteenth at the 2025 CS Nepela Memorial and twelfth at the 2025 CS Trialeti Trophy. He then went on to win bronze at the 2025 NRW Trophy and place twelfth at the 2025 CS Tallinn Trophy.

In December, Starostin finished the season by winning silver at the 2026 German Championships behind Genrikh Gartung.

== Programs ==
Season	Short program	Free skate	Exhibition	Ref.
2018–19	Ticket to the Moon by Jeff Lynne performed by Electric Light Orchestra choreo. by Juri Ananian	Sit Down Beside Me by Patrick Watson choreo. by Juri Ananian	—N/a	
2019–20	I'm No Angel by ERA choreo. by Adam Solya	Tango choreo. by Adam Solya	—N/a	
2021–22	Latch by Disclosure performed by Sam Smith choreo. by Adam Solya	Stay by Oliver Tompsett, Scott Alan choreo. by Adam Solya	—N/a	
2022–23	Maria (from West Side Story) by Leonard Bernstein performed by Mark Seibert choreo. by Adam Solya	Corner Of The Earth; Canned Heat by Jamiroquai choreo. by Adam Solya	Quand c'est?; Santé by Stromae	
2023–24	Disco Inferno by The Trammps arranged by Karl Hugo choreo. by Adam Solya; Pas de deux (from The Nutcracker) by Pyotr Ilyich Tchaikovsky choreo. by Adam Solya	I Want It That Way; Larger Than Life by Backstreet Boys choreo. by Adam Solya	—N/a	
2024–25	Never Gonna Give You Up (Cake Mix) Rick Astley, Mike Stock, Matt Aitken, & Pete Waterman choreo. by Adam Solya	Lascia ch'io pianga (Air de Almirena) by George Frideric Handel; Concerto in C Minor, RV 509: III. Allegro by Antonio Vivaldi choreo. by Adam Solya	You're My Heart, You're My Soul by Modern Talking; Disco Inferno	
2025–26	Follow Me Muse choreo. by Adam Solya	Aveline by Power-Haus; Marvel by Ryan Taubert choreo. by Adam Solya		

== Competitive highlights ==
- GP – Event of the ISU Grand Prix Series
- JGP – Event of the ISU Junior Grand Prix Series
- CS – Event of the ISU Challenger Series
- TBD – Assigned
- WD – Withdrew from competition

=== Single skating (for Germany) ===
Competition placements at senior level
Season	2021–22	2022–23	2023–24	2024–25	2025–26	2026–27
World Championships	22nd	19th	32nd	28th		
European Championships	13th	15th	13th	27th		
German Championships	3rd	1st	2nd	1st	2nd	
GP Finland			7th			
CS Budapest Trophy				3rd		12th
CS Denis Ten Memorial			7th			
CS Finlandia Trophy	12th	15th	9th			
CS Ice Challenge	8th	3rd				
CS Lombardia Trophy	12th		6th			
CS Nebelhorn Trophy		9th		16th	8th	8th
CS Nepela Memorial					14th	
CS Tallinn Trophy				4th	12th	
CS Trialeti Trophy					12th	
Challenge Cup	7th		4th			
NRW Trophy	3rd	1st			3rd	3rd
Road to 26 Trophy				9th		
Santa Claus Cup		6th				
Volvo Open Cup				8th		

Competition placements at junior level
Season	2018–19	2019–20
World Junior Championships	24th	
German Championships	7th	2nd
JGP Russia		16th
JGP Slovenia	12th	
Alpen Trophy	3rd	
Bavarian Open	5th	5th
Mentor Cup	4th	
NRW Trophy	1st	
Santa Claus Cup		1st
Tallinn Trophy	3rd	

=== Single skating (for Russia) ===
Competition placements at junior level
Season	2016–17
Tallinn Trophy	3rd

== Detailed results ==
=== Single skating (for Germany) ===
ISU personal best scores in the +5/-5 GOE System
Segment	Type	Score	Event
Total	TSS	217.87	2023 World Championships
Short program	TSS	75.78	2021 CS Cup of Austria
Short program	TES	42.58	2021 CS Cup of Austria
Short program	PCS	36.46	2022 World Championships
Free skating	TSS	145.08	2022 CS Ice Challenge
Free skating	TES	74.65	2022 CS Ice Challenge
Free skating	PCS	73.73	2023 World Championships

==== Senior level ====
Results in the 2021–22 season
Date	Event	SP		FS		Total	
Date	Event	P	Score	P	Score	P	Score
Sep 10–12, 2021	(Italy) 2021 CS Lombardia Trophy	6	69.02	14	118.72	12	187.74
Oct 7–10, 2021	(Finland) 2021 CS Finlandia Trophy	8	70.20	13	135.40	12	205.60
Nov 4–7, 2021	(Germany) 2021 NRW Trophy	3	67.79	5	112.65	3	180.44
Nov 11–14, 2021	2021 CS Cup of Austria	4	75.78	10	133.18	8	208.96
Dec 9–11, 2021	(Germany) 2022 German Championships	4	57.65	2	121.29	3	178.94
Jan 10–16, 2022	(Estonia) 2022 European Championships	14	72.12	12	142.28	13	214.40
Feb 24–27, 2022	(Netherlands) 2022 International Challenge Cup	9	66.61	6	130.79	7	197.40
Mar 21–27, 2022	(France) 2022 World Championships	23	73.79	22	131.93	22	205.72

Results in the 2022–23 season
Date	Event	SP		FS		Total	
Date	Event	P	Score	P	Score	P	Score
Sep 21–24, 2022	(Germany) 2022 CS Nebelhorn Trophy	12	61.91	10	123.05	9	184.96
Oct 4–9, 2022	(Finland) 2022 CS Finlandia Trophy	14	63.03	15	116.60	15	179.63
Nov 9–13, 2022	(Austria) 2022 CS Ice Challenge	4	71.96	3	145.08	3	217.04
Nov 24–27, 2022	(Germany) 2022 NRW Trophy	1	79.95	1	133.13	1	213.08
Nov 28 – Dec 4, 2022	(Hungary) 2022 Santa Claus Cup	8	59.19	5	124.27	6	183.46
Jan 5–7, 2023	(Germany) 2023 German Championships	2	70.26	1	156.43	1	226.69
Jan 25–29, 2023	(Finland) 2023 European Championships	10	74.70	17	123.27	15	197.97
Mar 22–26, 2023	(Japan) 2023 World Championships	16	75.53	19	142.34	19	217.87

Results in the 2023–24 season
Date	Event	SP		FS		Total	
Date	Event	P	Score	P	Score	P	Score
Sep 8–10, 2023	(Italy) 2023 CS Lombardia Trophy	5	69.30	6	129.02	6	198.32
Oct 4–8, 2023	(Finland) 2023 CS Finlandia Trophy	15	64.40	7	140.97	9	205.37
Nov 2–5, 2023	(Kazakhstan) 2023 CS Denis Ten Memorial Challenge	7	69.37	7	135.72	7	205.09
Nov 17–19, 2023	(Finland) 2023 Grand Prix of Espoo	8	71.99	9	129.16	7	201.15
Dec 14–16, 2023	(Germany) 2024 German Championships	2	65.61	2	133.33	2	198.94
Jan 10–14, 2024	(Lithuania) 2024 European Championships	14	71.99	14	139.86	13	211.85
Feb 22–25, 2024	(Netherlands) 2024 International Challenge Cup	4	76.81	5	143.57	4	220.38
Mar 18–24, 2024	(Canada) 2024 World Championships	32	67.34	—N/a	—N/a	32	67.34

Results in the 2024–25 season
Date	Event	SP		FS		Total	
Date	Event	P	Score	P	Score	P	Score
Sep 18–21, 2024	(Germany) 2024 CS Nebelhorn Trophy	20	56.32	12	125.12	16	181.44
Oct 11–13, 2024	(Hungary) 2024 CS Budapest Trophy	6	62.76	3	136.32	3	199.08
Oct 31 – Nov 3, 2024	(Latvia) 2024 Volvo Open Cup	3	67.35	8	115.58	8	182.93
Nov 11–17, 2024	(Estonia) 2024 CS Tallinn Trophy	10	67.43	2	143.78	4	211.21
Dec 16–21, 2024	(Germany) 2025 German Championships	1	72.99	1	147.02	1	220.01
Jan 28 – Feb 2, 2025	(Estonia) 2025 European Championships	27	63.54	—N/a	—N/a	27	63.54
Feb 18–20, 2025	(Italy) 2025 Road to 26 Trophy	8	65.41	9	124.01	9	189.42
Mar 24–30, 2025	(United States) 2025 World Championships	28	70.72	—N/a	—N/a	28	70.72

Results in the 2025–26 season
Date	Event	SP		FS		Total	
Date	Event	P	Score	P	Score	P	Score
Sep 25–27, 2025	(Slovakia) 2025 CS Nepela Memorial	18	61.74	13	132.83	14	194.57
Oct 8–11, 2025	(Georgia (country)) 2025 CS Trialeti Trophy	14	61.09	10	128.68	12	189.77
Nov 13–16, 2025	(Germany) 2025 NRW Trophy	4	65.94	1	153.61	3	219.55
Nov 25–30, 2025	(Estonia) 2025 CS Tallinn Trophy	18	61.07	10	129.85	12	190.92
Dec 8–13, 2025	(Germany) 2026 German Championships	2	71.49	2	139.70	2	211.19

Results in the 2026–27 season
Date	Event	SP		FS		Total	
Date	Event	P	Score	P	Score	P	Score
Sep 24–26, 2026	(Germany) 2026 CS Nebelhorn Trophy	6	75.76	8	136.85	8	212.11
Oct 15–18, 2026	(Hungary) 2026 CS Budapest Trophy	13	65.85	11	126.21	12	192.06
Nov 12–15, 2026	(Germany) 2026 NRW Trophy	3	72.29	3	134.77	3	207.06

==== Junior level ====
Results in the 2018–19 season
Date	Event	SP		FS		Total	
Date	Event	P	Score	P	Score	P	Score
Aug 10–12, 2018	(Germany) 2018 NRW Trophy	1	54.32	1	109.07	1	163.39
Oct 3–6, 2018	2018 JGP Slovenia	10	58.24	14	100.74	12	158.98
Nov 11–18, 2018	(Austria) 2018 Alpen Trophy	2	59.53	3	101.42	3	160.95
Nov 26 – Dec 2, 2018	(Estonia) 2018 Tallinn Trophy	4	60.77	3	111.60	3	172.37
Dec 7–9, 2018	(Germany) 2019 German Championships (Junior)	5	46.57	6	85.08	7	131.65
Jan 8–13, 2019	(Poland) 2019 Mentor Cup	1	58.48	4	99.35	4	157.83
Feb 5–10, 2019	(Germany) 2019 Bavarian Open	4	55.17	6	96.21	5	151.38
Mar 4–10, 2019	(Croatia) 2019 World Junior Championships	22	61.61	24	90.39	24	152.00

Results in the 2019–20 season
Date	Event	SP		FS		Total	
Date	Event	P	Score	P	Score	P	Score
Sep 11–14, 2019	2019 JGP Russia	13	54.86	16	88.97	16	143.83
Dec 2–8, 2019	(Hungary) 2019 Santa Claus Cup	1	58.90	1	103.61	1	162.51
Jan 1–3, 2020	(Germany) 2020 German Championships (Junior)	2	58.73	2	99.13	2	157.86
Feb 3–9, 2020	(Germany) 2020 Bavarian Open	4	67.22	6	110.61	5	177.83

=== Single skating (for Russia) ===
Results in the 2016–17 season
Date	Event	SP		FS		Total	
Date	Event	P	Score	P	Score	P	Score
Nov 22–27, 2016	(Estonia) 2016 Tallinn Trophy	4	48.52	4	93.64	3	142.16
