= Jenni Saarinen =

Finnish figure skater (born 1999)

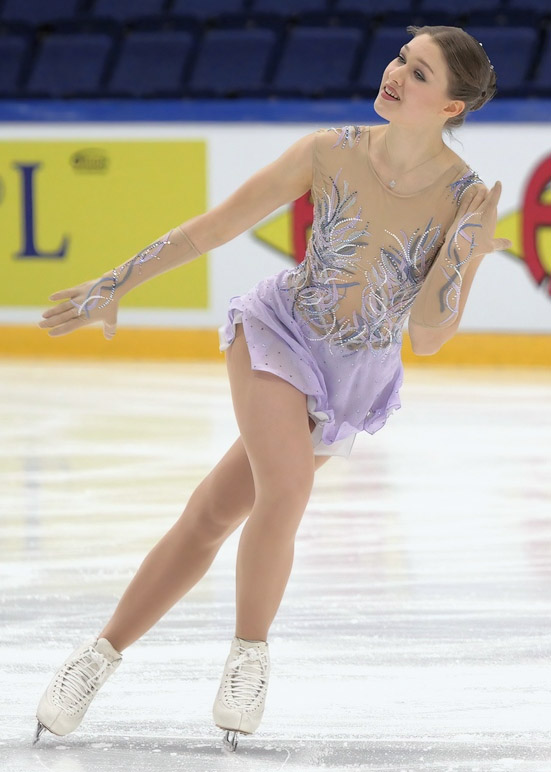
- Saarinen at the 2021 Finlandia Trophy

Personal information
- Born: 9 March 1999 (age 27) Espoo, Finland
- Home town: Tampere, Finland
- Height: 1.67 m (5 ft 6 in)

Figure skating career
- Country: Finland
- Skating club: Koovee
- Began skating: 2004
- Retired: 26 November 2022

Medal record
Finnish Championships
Gold medal – first place	2022 Pori	Singles
Silver medal – second place	2020 Vantaa	Singles
Silver medal – second place	2017 Tampere	Singles
Silver medal – second place	2016 Mikkeli	Singles
Silver medal – second place	2015 Vantaa	Singles
Bronze medal – third place	2019 Kouvola	Singles
Bronze medal – third place	2018 Kouvola	Singles

Jenni Saarinen (born 9 March 1999) is a Finnish retired competitive figure skater. She is a two-time Challenger series bronze medalist, a two-time Nordics champion (2015, 2019), the 2018 Christmas Cup silver medalist, and the 2022 Finnish national champion.

Saarinen represented Finland at the 2022 Winter Olympics.

== Personal life ==
Jenni Saarinen was born on 9 March 1999 in Espoo, Finland. She practiced gymnastics for five years as a child.

== Career ==
=== Early years ===
Saarinen started skating when she was about five years old. She began competing on the junior international level in the autumn of 2012. She was assigned to the 2013 World Junior Championships in Milan, Italy, where she finished 14th.

Saarinen made her ISU Junior Grand Prix (JGP) debut and won the junior title at the 2014 Finnish Championships. She placed 13th at the 2014 World Junior Championships in Sofia, Bulgaria.

=== Senior career ===
Saarinen continued competing on the JGP series before making her senior international debut at the 2014 Finlandia Trophy, a Challenger Series (CS) event. In November 2014, she won a bronze medal at the CS Volvo Open Cup. In the 2015 World Junior Championships in Tallinn, she placed 8th in the short program and 13th overall.

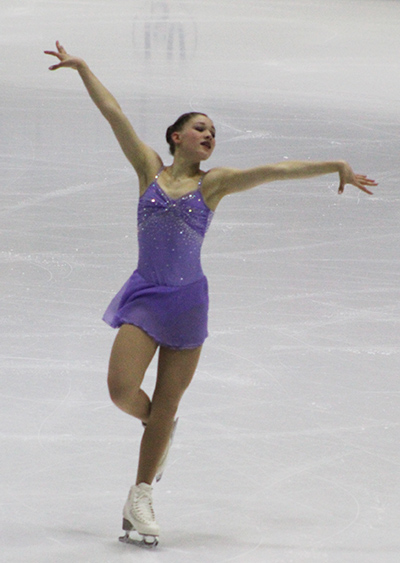
Saarinen at the 2015 World Junior Championships

In the 2015–16 season, Saarinen was assigned to the 2015 Tallinn Trophy but withdrew before the short program. In December, she won the silver medal at the 2016 Finnish Figure Skating Championships, only 0.15 points behind Anni Järvenpää. She was 3rd in the short program and won the free skating.

Saarinen made her senior World Championship debut at the 2021 World Championships in Stockholm, placing twenty-fourth. This result qualified a place for Finland at the 2022 Winter Olympics in Beijing. The following season, Saarinen won the senior Finnish national title for the first time and made the free skate at the 2022 European Championships, finishing seventeenth; she originally finished eighteenth overall, but the retroactive disqualification of Kamila Valieva resulted in all other ladies singles skaters moving up a place. Named to the Finnish Olympic team, Saarinen placed twenty-fifth in the short program of the Olympic women's event. This would normally have had her one ordinal outside qualification to the free skate, but due to the controversial Court of Arbitration for Sport (CAS) decision allowing Valieva to compete in the event despite suspicion of illegal doping the International Olympic Committee decreed that twenty-five skaters would advance. Saarinen finished twenty-fourth overall; she originally finished twenty-fifth overall, but Valieva was disqualified by the CAS in 2024 and all skaters who originally placed fifth or lower moved up a place. She was twenty-fifth as well at the 2022 World Championships.

Illness delayed the start of Saarinen's 2022–23 season, while she also struggled with motivation and had it affect her everyday life. After finishing twelfth at the 2022 CS Ice Challenge, Saarinen decided that she would retire following the 2022 Grand Prix of Espoo, the second special Grand Prix event held in Finland. She placed ninth at the event and explained afterward that she had "a long, great career with ups and downs. I'm starting to get to the point in life where there are other things in life."

== Programs ==
Season	Short program	Free skating	Exhibition
2022–2023	I Giorni; Dona Nobis Pacem by Ludovico Einaudi performed by Angèle Dubeau & La Pietà choreo. by Adam Solya	I'll Take Care of You by Brook Benton performed by Beth Hart, Joe Bonamassa choreo. by Mark Pillay	Liebesträume No. 3 by Franz Liszt performed by Éva Polgár; Scared to Be Lonely by Dua Lipa & Martin Garrix
2021–2022	Clair de lune by Claude Debussy choreo. by Adam Solya	Piano Concerto No. 2 in C Minor by Sergei Rachmaninoff choreo. by Adam Solya	
2020–2021	Clair de lune by Claude Debussy choreo. by Adam Solya	Oriental by Raul Ferrando, Fathi Aljarah, Adam Hurst choreo. by Adam Solya	
2019–2020	Differente by Gotan Project choreo. by Mark Pillay	I'll Take Care of You by Brook Benton performed by Beth Hart, Joe Bonamassa choreo. by Mark Pillay	
2018–2019	Otoño Porteño (from Estaciones Porteñas) by Astor Piazzolla	I'll Take Care of You by Brook Benton performed by Beth Hart, Joe Bonamassa choreo. by Mark Pillay	
2017–2018	Otoño Porteño (from Estaciones Porteñas) by Astor Piazzolla	Angel by the Wings by Sia	
2016–2017	Otoño Porteño (from Estaciones Porteñas) by Astor Piazzolla	Human by Christina Perri	
2015–2016	Otoño Porteño (from Estaciones Porteñas) by Astor Piazzolla	The Mask of Zorro by James Horner	
2014–2015	Flamenco performed by Ikuko Kawai	El tiempo entre costuras by Cesar Benito; El Falso Delphos; L'Atelier; Nas Ruas de Lisboa; Una Maquina de Escribir	
2013–2014	Flamenco performed by Ikuko Kawai	Solitary Hill; Canon in D; Wind	
2012–2013	To the Fair (from Beauty and the Beast) by Alan Menken; The Euphorium (from Mr. Magorium's Wonder Emporium) by Alexandre Desplat	Pop Quiz and The Time Machine Montage by Danny Elfman; Fairytale by Harry Gregson-Williams, John Powell	

== Competitive highlights ==
CS: Challenger Series; GP: Grand Prix; JGP: Junior Grand Prix

International
Event	12–13	13–14	14–15	15–16	16–17	17–18	18–19	19–20	20–21	21–22	22–23
Olympics										24th	
Worlds									24th	25th	
Europeans								33rd		17th	
GP Finland											9th
CS Asian Open										5th	
CS Finlandia Trophy			5th					4th		12th	
CS Ice Challenge											12th
CS Lombardia Trophy								9th			
CS Nebelhorn Trophy									3rd		
CS Tallinn Trophy				WD		17th					
CS Volvo Cup			3rd								
CS Warsaw Cup								10th		9th	
Challenge Cup								8th	12th	10th	
Christmas Cup							2nd				
Cup of Tyrol				4th							
Denkova-Staviski						4th					
FBMA Trophy					4th						
Nordics			1st	4th	12th	6th	1st	3rd			
NRW Trophy									3rd	5th	
International: Junior
Junior Worlds	14th	13th	13th								
JGP Czech Rep.		7th									
JGP Japan			9th								
JGP Poland		10th									
JGP Slovenia			9th								
EYOF			4th								
Bavarian Open		1st									
Cup of Nice	3rd										
Ice Star	1st										
Nordics	1st	1st									
National
Finnish Champ.	3rd J	1st J	2nd	2nd	2nd	3rd	3rd	2nd	C	1st	
J = Junior level; WD = Withdrew; C = Event Cancelled

== Detailed results ==
Small medals for short and free programs awarded only at ISU Championships. Personal bests highlighted in bold.

2022–23 season
Date	Event	SP	FS	Total
November 25–27, 2022	2022 Grand Prix of Espoo	8; 59.69	11; 95.95	9; 155.64
November 9–13, 2022	2022 CS Ice Challenge	11; 51.60	10; 101.68	12; 153.28
**2021–22 season**
Date	Event	SP	FS	Total
March 21–27, 2022	2022 World Championships	25; 55.30	-	25; 55.30
February 24–27, 2022	2022 Challenge Cup	3; 57.48	13; 84.22	10; 141.70
February 15–17, 2022	2022 Winter Olympics	24; 56.97	24; 96.07	24; 153.04
January 10–16, 2022	2022 European Championships	15; 58.93	18; 101.39	17; 160.32
November 17–20, 2021	2021 CS Warsaw Cup	2; **68.71**	16; 96.14	9; 164.85
November 4–7, 2021	2021 NRW Trophy	3; 57.26	6; 91.04	5; 148.30
October 13–17, 2021	2021 Asian Open Trophy	3; 62.25	8; 92.20	5; 154.45
October 7–10, 2021	2021 CS Finlandia Trophy	7; 67.05	17; 101.67	12; 168.72
**2020–21 season**
Date	Event	SP	FS	Total
March 22–28, 2021	2021 World Championships	14; 63.54	24; 83.00	24; 146.54
February 25–28, 2021	2021 International Challenge Cup	11; 52.23	13; 88.93	12; 141.16
November 26–29, 2020	2020 NRW Trophy	6; 51.92	3; 96.03	3; 147.95
September 23–26, 2020	2020 Nebelhorn Trophy	4; 57.25	2; 106.62	3; 163.87
2019–20 season
Date	Event	SP	FS	Total
February 20–23, 2020	2020 Challenge Cup	4; 61.03	13; 93.82	8; 154.85
February 5–9, 2020	2019 Nordic Championships	4; 54.76	1; 116.47	3; 171.23
January 20–26, 2020	2020 European Championships	33; 42.61	—	33; 42.61
November 14–17, 2019	2019 CS Warsaw Cup	8; 55.37	12; 105.27	10; 160.64
October 11–13, 2019	2019 CS Finlandia Trophy	4; 60.06	4; **121.14**	4; **181.20**
September 13–15, 2019	2019 CS Lombardia Trophy	6; 57.66	9; 103.98	9; 161.64
2018–19 season
Date	Event	SP	FS	Total
February 7–10, 2019	2019 Nordic Championships	1; 56.07	1; 106.56	1; 162.63
December 14–16, 2018	2019 Finnish Championships	3; 54.51	2; 105.28	3; 159.79
2017–18 season
Date	Event	SP	FS	Total
February 4–8, 2018	2018 Nordic Championships	4; 50.31	6; 84.70	6; 135.01
November 21–26, 2017	2017 CS Tallinn Trophy	9; 53.87	19; 84.88	17; 138.75
31 October – 4 November 2017	2017 Denkova-Staviski Cup	2; 55.93	8; 79.58	4; 135.51
2016–17 season
Date	Event	SP	FS	Total
March 2–5, 2017	2017 Nordic Championships	6; 48.63	14; 58.65	12; 107.28
January 5–7, 2017	2017 FBMA Trophy	7; 39.57	2; 86.82	4; 126.39
December 15–18, 2016	2017 Finnish Championships	3; 52.25	2; 87.24	2; 139.49
2015–16 season
Date	Event	SP	FS	Total
March 9–13, 2016	2016 Cup of Tyrol	5; 51.45	5; 82.03	4; 133.48
February 24–28, 2016	2016 Nordic Championships	4; 54.37	4; 94.32	4; 148.69
December 18–20, 2015	2016 Finnish Championships	3; 51.62	1; 103.14	2; 154.76
2014–15 season
Date	Event	SP	FS	Total@
March 2–8, 2015	2015 World Junior Championships	8; 55.43	15; 84.07	13; 139.50
February 11–15, 2015	2015 Nordic Championships	2; 50.09	2; 95.98	1; 146.07
January 26–28, 2015	2015 European Youth Olympic Winter Festival	8; 43.69	3; 85.24	4; 128.93
November 18–22, 2014	2015 Finnish Championships	2; 52.81	2; 104.19	2; 157.00
November 5–9, 2014	2014 CS Volvo Open Cup	1; 50.05	4; 91.25	3; 141.30
October 9–12, 2014	2014 CS Finlandia Trophy	6; 48.55	4; 95.61	5; 144.16
2013–14 season
Date	Event	SP	FS	Total
March 10–16, 2014	2014 World Junior Championships	8; 53.76	13; 87.26	13; 141.02
