= 2021 CS Lombardia Trophy =

- Type: ISU Challenger Series
- Date: September 10 – 12
- Season: 2021–22
- Location: Bergamo, Italy
- Host: Federazione Italiana Sport del Ghiaccio
- Venue: IceLab Bergamo Palaghiaccio

Champions
- Men's singles: (Italy) Daniel Grassl
- Women's singles: (United States) Alysa Liu
- Ice dance: (Italy) Charlène Guignard / Marco Fabbri
- Previous: 2019 CS Lombardia Trophy
- Next: 2022 CS Lombardia Trophy
- Previous CS: 2020 CS Budapest Trophy
- Next CS: 2021 CS Autumn Classic

The 2021 CS Lombardia Trophy Memorial Anna Grandolfi was held on September 10–12, 2021 in Bergamo, Italy. It was part of the 2021–22 ISU Challenger Series. Medals were awarded in the disciplines of men's singles, women's singles, and ice dance.

== Entries ==
The International Skating Union published the list of entries on August 18, 2021.

Country	Men	Women	Ice dance
Austria	Luc Maierhofer; Maurizio Zandron	Stefanie Pesendorfer; Sophia Schaller	
Azerbaijan	Vladimir Litvintsev		Ekaterina Kuznetsova / Oleksandr Kolosovskyi
Belarus	Konstantin Milyukov		
Bulgaria	Larry Loupolover; Radoslav Marinov	Ivelina Baycheva	
Canada			Alicia Fabbri / Paul Ayer; Laurence Fournier Beaudry / Nikolaj Sørensen
Chile		Yae-Mia Neira	
Czech Republic	Matyáš Bělohradský	Oluša Gajdošová	Natálie Taschlerová / Filip Taschler
Estonia	Arlet Levandi; Aleksandr Selevko	Eva-Lotta Kiibus; Nataly Langerbaur; Kristina Škuleta-Gromova	
Finland			Yuka Orihara / Juho Pirinen; Juulia Turkkila / Matthias Versluis
France	Romain Ponsart; Adam Siao Him Fa; Adrien Tesson	Maïa Mazzara; Léa Serna	Loïcia Demougeot / Théo Le Mercier; Evgeniia Lopareva / Geoffrey Brissaud; Julia Wagret / Pierre Souquet-Basiege
Georgia	Morisi Kvitelashvili		
Germany	Nikita Starostin	Nargiz Süleymanova	Jennifer Janse van Rensburg / Benjamin Steffan
Great Britain	Graham Newberry	Nina Povey; Kristen Spours	
Hungary	Máté Böröcz; András Csernoch	Regina Schermann; Bernadett Szigeti; Ivett Tóth	Emese Csiszèr / Axel Lamasse; Mariia Ignateva / Danijil Szemko; Anna Yanovskaya / Ádám Lukács
Italy	Daniel Grassl	Lara Naki Gutmann; Ginevra Lavinia Negrello	Charlène Guignard / Marco Fabbri; Carolina Moscheni / Francesco Fioretti; Carolina Portesi Peroni / Michael Chrastecky
Latvia		Anete Lāce	
Liechtenstein		Romana Kaiser	
Monaco	Davide Lewton Brain		
Netherlands		Lindsay van Zundert	
Peru		Nayra Rosalia Junco Metzger; Victoria Velarde	
Poland		Ekaterina Kurakova	
Romania		Julia Sauter	
Serbia		Antonina Dubinina	
Slovakia			Mária Sofia Pucherová / Nikita Lysak
Slovenia		Daša Grm	
South Africa	Matthew Samuels		
Spain	Tomás Llorenç Guarino Sabaté		Sara Hurtado / Kirill Khaliavin
Switzerland	Leon Auspurg	Alexia Paganini; Shaline Rüegger; Yasmine Kimiko Yamada	
United States	Tomoki Hiwatashi; Yaroslav Paniot	Alysa Liu; Audrey Shin	Christina Carreira / Anthony Ponomarenko; Molly Cesanek / Yehor Yehorov

=== Changes to preliminary assignments ===
Date	Discipline	Withdrew	Added	Reason/Other notes	Refs
August 22	Men	(Latvia) Daniels Kockers			
August 22	Men	(Latvia) Kirills Korkacs			
August 22	Men	(Finland) Roman Galay			
August 22	Women	(Finland) Laura Karhunen	(Slovenia) Daša Grm		
August 22	Women	(Finland) Emmi Peltonen			
August 22	Ice dance	(Australia) Chantelle Kerry / Andrew Dodds	(South Korea) Yura Min / Daniel Eaton		
August 22	Ice dance	(Latvia) Aurēlija Ipolīto / Luke Russell			
August 25	Ice dance	(South Korea) Yura Min / Daniel Eaton			
September 2	Women	(Bulgaria) Kristina Grigorova			
September 2	Women	(Bulgaria) Maria Manova			
September 2	Women	(Greece) Alexandra Mintsidou			
September 2	Women	(Italy) Lucrezia Beccari		Positive COVID-19 Test	
September 2	Ice dance	(Poland) Jenna Hertenstein / Damian Binkowski			
September 7	Men	(Italy) Nikolaj Memola			
September 7	Women	(Austria) Lara Roth			
September 7	Women	(Latvia) Mariia Bolsheva			
September 7	Women	(Latvia) Angelīna Kučvaļska			
September 7	Ice dance	(Italy) Chiara Calderone / Francesco Riva			
September 7	Ice dance	(Lithuania) Paulina Ramanauskaitė / Deividas Kizala			

== Results ==
=== Men ===
Rank	Name	Nation	Total points	SP		FS	
1	Daniel Grassl	Italy	247.80	5	74.26	1	173.54
2	Adam Siao Him Fa	France	237.39	2	80.54	3	156.85
3	Morisi Kvitelashvili	Georgia	236.18	4	76.52	2	159.66
4	Vladimir Litvintsev	Azerbaijan	218.80	1	80.83	5	137.97
5	Tomoki Hiwatashi	United States	213.11	9	66.69	4	146.42
6	Romain Ponsart	France	204.39	3	78.23	10	126.16
7	Arlet Levandi	Estonia	198.67	11	63.67	6	135.00
8	Aleksandr Selevko	Estonia	197.71	7	68.78	7	128.93
9	Davide Lewton Brain	Monaco	193.02	8	67.36	11	125.66
10	Konstantin Milyukov	Belarus	192.41	10	65.08	8	127.33
11	Adrien Tesson	France	190.12	14	63.07	9	127.05
12	Nikita Starostin	Germany	187.74	6	69.02	14	118.72
13	Maurizio Zandron	Austria	184.73	12	63.47	13	121.26
14	Graham Newberry	Great Britain	182.33	16	60.60	12	121.73
15	Tomás Llorenç Guarino Sabaté	Spain	178.46	13	63.22	15	115.24
16	Luc Maierhofer	Austria	167.46	15	62.90	16	104.56
17	Matyáš Bělohradský	Czech Republic	156.16	18	57.59	17	98.57
18	Larry Loupolover	Bulgaria	142.63	17	59.91	23	82.72
19	Radoslav Marinov	Bulgaria	141.23	19	54.93	20	86.30
20	Matthew Samuels	South Africa	140.07	22	41.91	18	98.16
21	András Csernoch	Hungary	136.03	20	50.38	21	85.65
22	Máté Böröcz	Hungary	133.74	21	47.37	19	86.37
23	Leon Auspurg	Switzerland	117.58	23	34.80	22	82.78
WD	Yaroslav Paniot	United States	withdrew	withdrew from competition			

=== Women ===
Rank	Name	Nation	Total points	SP		FS	
1	Alysa Liu	United States	219.24	1	74.31	1	144.93
2	Ekaterina Kurakova	Poland	187.65	3	61.51	2	126.14
3	Audrey Shin	United States	172.46	5	58.80	4	113.66
4	Alexia Paganini	Switzerland	171.48	2	62.14	5	109.34
5	Lara Naki Gutmann	Italy	166.98	18	48.65	3	118.33
6	Yasmine Kimiko Yamada	Switzerland	165.39	4	58.89	7	106.50
7	Lindsay van Zundert	Netherlands	163.36	6	57.90	8	105.46
8	Sophia Schaller	Austria	159.08	9	52.45	6	106.63
9	Regina Schermann	Hungary	157.66	7	54.04	11	103.62
10	Léa Serna	France	156.66	14	51.36	9	105.30
11	Eva-Lotta Kiibus	Estonia	155.52	16	50.78	10	104.74
12	Kristina Škuleta-Gromova	Estonia	147.13	8	53.58	14	93.55
13	Julia Sauter	Romania	146.84	11	52.08	12	94.76
14	Maïa Mazzara	France	142.57	10	52.39	15	90.18
15	Daša Grm	Slovenia	141.21	13	51.80	16	89.41
16	Stefanie Pesendorfer	Austria	140.97	22	46.85	13	94.12
17	Ginevra Lavinia Negrello	Italy	140.93	12	51.89	17	89.04
18	Nina Povey	Great Britain	140.35	15	51.35	18	89.00
19	Kristen Spours	Great Britain	134.25	23	46.28	19	87.97
20	Nataly Langerbaur	Estonia	128.55	24	45.52	20	83.03
21	Bernadett Szigeti	Hungary	127.54	20	47.95	21	79.59
22	Ivelina Baycheva	Bulgaria	126.45	17	49.22	23	77.23
23	Anete Lāce	Latvia	124.10	19	48.16	24	75.94
24	Antonina Dubinina	Serbia	121.02	25	43.47	22	77.55
25	Shaline Rüegger	Switzerland	115.55	26	42.67	26	72.88
26	Oluša Gajdošová	Czech Republic	114.13	27	40.61	25	73.52
27	Ivett Tóth	Hungary	104.97	28	39.53	28	65.44
28	Yae-Mia Neira	Chile	99.52	29	31.92	27	67.60
29	Victoria Velarde	Peru	85.27	30	28.16	29	57.11
30	Romana Kaiser	Liechtenstein	79.01	31	27.37	30	51.64
31	Nayra Rosalia Junco Metzger	Peru	50.11	32	15.99	31	34.12
WD	Nargiz Süleymanova	Germany	withdrew	21	47.19	withdrew from competition	

=== Ice dance ===
Rank	Name	Nation	Total points	RD		FD	
1	Charlène Guignard / Marco Fabbri	Italy	205.36	1	82.05	1	123.31
2	Laurence Fournier Beaudry / Nikolaj Sørensen	Canada	185.26	2	76.64	2	108.62
3	Sara Hurtado / Kirill Khaliavin	Spain	180.98	3	72.65	3	108.33
4	Christina Carreira / Anthony Ponomarenko	United States	172.78	4	69.08	6	103.70
5	Natálie Taschlerová / Filip Taschler	Czech Republic	172.74	5	68.45	4	104.29
6	Juulia Turkkila / Matthias Versluis	Finland	171.23	7	67.26	5	103.97
7	Jennifer Janse van Rensburg / Benjamin Steffan	Germany	165.35	8	65.97	7	99.38
8	Evgeniia Lopareva / Geoffrey Brissaud	France	157.43	6	67.43	12	90.00
9	Loïcia Demougeot / Théo Le Mercier	France	153.43	10	62.61	11	90.82
10	Anna Yanovskaya / Ádám Lukács	Hungary	153.17	13	60.81	9	92.36
11	Carolina Portesi Peroni / Michael Chrastecky	Italy	153.07	12	60.94	10	92.13
12	Alicia Fabbri / Paul Ayer	Canada	152.49	9	64.77	14	87.72
13	Molly Cesanek / Yehor Yehorov	United States	151.76	14	58.75	8	93.01
14	Julia Wagret / Pierre Souquet-Basiege	France	150.30	11	61.74	13	88.56
15	Yuka Orihara / Juho Pirinen	Finland	144.80	15	57.98	16	86.82
16	Carolina Moscheni / Francesco Fioretti	Italy	140.56	16	53.64	15	86.92
17	Mariia Ignateva / Danyil Szemko	Hungary	129.91	18	51.96	17	77.95
18	Emese Csiszér / Axel Lamasse	Hungary	127.13	17	52.43	18	74.70
19	Ekaterina Kuznetsova / Oleksandr Kolosovskyi	Azerbaijan	121.45	20	48.43	19	73.02
20	Mária Sofia Pucherová / Nikita Lysak	Slovakia	120.67	19	49.54	20	71.13
