= Romana Kaiser =

Liechtenstein figure skater (born 1997)

Personal information
- Full name: Romana Brigitta Kaiser
- Born: 25 June 1997 (age 29) Grabs, Switzerland
- Home town: Schellenberg, Liechtenstein
- Height: 1.62 m (5 ft 4 in)

Figure skating career
- Country: Liechtenstein
- Coach: Barbara Luoni
- Skating club: Mittelrheintal Widnau Skating Club
- Began skating: 2004

Romana Brigitta Kaiser (born 25 June 1997) is a Swiss-born Liechtensteiner retired figure skater who represented Liechtenstein in women's singles. She is the 2019 Triglav Trophy silver medalist and a four-time Liechtensteiner national champion (2017–2020).

== Personal life ==
Kaiser has an older and a younger sister. Several of Kaiser's relatives are also involved in figure skating; she has aunts who are officials in Swiss skating clubs and a cousin who skated for several years in Switzerland. She attended the Sports School Liechtenstein.

Kaiser also began artistic gymnastics when she was nine. She won titles at the Swiss championships in 2009 and 2010, and the Liechtenstein championships in 2011, but she decided to focus on figure skating after that point.

== Career ==
Kaiser initially trained in Widnau, where she first began skating, and Feldkirch, as there were no rinks located in Liechtenstein. Later in her career, she also spent time training in Bergamo, Italy for several years.

She began skating as a member of Swiss Ice Skating. In 2011, several friends and her parents founded the Liechtensteinian Skating Association, of which her father is the president, so that Liechtensteiner skaters could represent their country at competitions. She won four consecutive senior Liechtensteiner titles from 2017 to 2020.

In 2015, she competed on the Junior Grand Prix circuit and was given both of the quotas allocated to Liechtenstein. She competed at the stages in Riga, where she was 31st, and Linz, where she was 30th.

Kaiser debuted on the Challenger Series in 2017, where she was 34th at the Lombardia Trophy and 25th at the Nebelhorn Trophy. The next year, she competed at the 2018 Alpen Trophy and placed 24th.

She was a member of the first Liechtensteiner delegation sent to a Winter Universiade in February 2019. There she qualified for the free skate and placed 22nd.

Kaiser won her first international medal that April at the Triglav Trophy. Although she fell on both her attempts at a triple toe loop jump, she received good scores on her spins and finished in second place, winning the silver medal. In the fall, she was 17th at the 2019 Lombardia Trophy.

She took five months off from training in 2020 due to an injury that caused inflammation in her pelvis. She began training again in early 2021. She was able to train at full capacity in June and returned to competition in the fall. In September, she competed at the Lombardia Trophy, where she was 30th, and the Nebelhorn Trophy, where she finished 34th.

Kaiser announced in April 2022 that she had retired due to several reasons, including chronic injuries.

== Competitive highlights ==
CS: Challenger Series; JGP: Junior Grand Prix

International
Event	14–15	15–16	16–17	17–18	18–19	19–20	20–21	21–22
CS Alpen Trophy					24th			
CS Golden Spin						WD		
CS Lombardia				34th		17th		30th
CS Nebelhorn				25th				34th
Budapest Trophy								20th
Coupe du Printemps		13th						
Cup of Tyrol			19th	17th	17th			
Egna Trophy				10th				
Golden Bear			14th	11th	23rd	21st		
Halloween Cup						22nd		
Merano Cup			14th					
NRW Trophy			19th					
Open d'Andorra						9th		7th
Prague Ice Cup						12th		
Santa Claus Cup			14th	23rd				
Skate Celje								9th
Sofia Trophy				11th	8th			
Toruń Cup				8th				
Triglav Trophy					2nd			
Warsaw Cup					19th			
Winter Universiade					22nd			
International:Junior
JGP Austria		30th						
JGP Latvia		31st						
Coupe du Printemps	19th							
Cup of Tyrol		10th						
Hellmut Seibt	24th							
National
Liechtensteiner Champ.			1st	1st	1st	1st		
