= 2019 CS Lombardia Trophy =

- Type: ISU Challenger Series
- Date: September 13 – 15
- Season: 2019–20
- Location: Bergamo, Italy
- Host: Italian Ice Sports Federation
- Venue: Ice Lab

Champions
- Men's singles: (China) Jin Boyang
- Ladies' singles: (Russia) Anna Shcherbakova
- Ice dance: (Italy) Charlène Guignard / Marco Fabbri
- Previous: 2018 CS Lombardia Trophy
- Next: 2021 CS Lombardia Trophy
- Previous CS: 2019 CS Autumn Classic International
- Next CS: 2019 CS U.S. International Classic

The 2019 CS Lombardia Trophy was held in September 2019 in Bergamo, Italy. It was part of the 2019–20 ISU Challenger Series. Medals were awarded in the disciplines of men's singles, ladies' singles, and ice dance.

== Entries ==
The International Skating Union published the list of entries on August 19, 2019.

Country	Men	Ladies	Ice dance
Australia			India Nette / Eron Westwood
Austria	Maurizio Zandron	Sophia Schaller	
Canada			Laurence Fournier Beaudry / Nikolaj Sørensen; Marjorie Lajoie / Zachary Lagha
China	Jin Boyang		
Czech Republic		Klara Stepanova	
Finland	Roman Galay	Jenni Saarinen	Yuka Orihara / Juho Pirinen; Juulia Turkkila / Matthias Versluis
France	Adrien Tesson		Adelina Galyavieva / Louis Thauron
Georgia	Morisi Kvitelashvili		
Hungary	András Csernoch		
Italy	Matteo Rizzo	Lucrezia Beccari	Chiara Calderone / Pietro Papetti; Charlène Guignard / Marco Fabbri; Jasmine Tessari / Francesco Fioretti
Japan	Kazuki Tomono	Wakaba Higuchi	
Liechtenstein		Romana Kaiser	
Lithuania		Greta Morkyte	Allison Reed / Saulius Ambrulevičius
Norway	Sondre Oddvoll Bøe		
Russia	Dmitri Aliev; Andrei Lazukin; Egor Murashov	Sofia Samodurova; Anna Shcherbakova; Elizaveta Tuktamysheva	Ekaterina Mironova / Evgenii Ustenko; Anastasia Shpilevaya / Grigory Smirnov
South Africa	Matthew Samuels		
South Korea		Kim Ye-lim; You Young	
Spain		Valentina Matos	
Sweden		Josefin Taljegård	
Ukraine			Alexandra Nazarova / Maxim Nikitin
United Kingdom	Peter James Hallam	Natasha McKay	Robynne Tweedale / Joseph Buckland
United States		Starr Andrews; Megan Wessenberg	Caroline Green / Michael Parsons

=== Changes to preliminary assignments ===
Date	Discipline	Withdrew	Added	Reason/Other notes	Refs
August 27	Ladies		(Liechtenstein) Romana Kaiser		
August 27	Ice Dance	(Hungary) Leia Dozzi / Michael Albert Valdez			
August 28	Ladies	(Kazakhstan) Elizabet Tursynbaeva		Injury	
September 3	Ladies	(Hungary) Fruzsina Medgyesi			
September 3	Ladies	(United Kingdom) Kristen Spours			
September 10	Men	(Poland) Olgierd Febbi	N/A		
September 10	Men	(Switzerland) Nicola Todeschini	N/A		
September 10	Ladies	(Armenia) Anastasia Galustyan	N/A		
September 10	Ladies	(France) Julie Froetscher	N/A		
September 10	Ladies	(France) Oceane Piegad	N/A		
September 10	Ladies	(Italy) Chenny Paolucci	N/A		
September 10	Ladies	(Lithuania) Elžbieta Kropa	N/A		

== Results ==
=== Men ===
Rank	Name	Nation	Total points	SP		FS	
1	Jin Boyang	China	268.31	1	101.09	2	167.22
2	Dmitri Aliev	Russia	249.62	2	81.18	1	168.44
3	Matteo Rizzo	Italy	227.38	5	71.76	3	155.62
4	Morisi Kvitelashvili	Georgia	220.96	4	74.15	4	146.81
5	Egor Murashov	Russia	219.39	3	74.83	5	144.56
6	Roman Galay	Finland	203.52	8	67.04	7	136.48
7	Kazuki Tomono	Japan	203.08	11	61.69	6	141.39
8	Peter James Hallam	United Kingdom	195.61	7	67.62	8	127.99
9	Maurizio Zandron	Austria	185.57	6	70.75	11	114.82
10	Adrien Tesson	France	182.33	9	66.65	9	115.68
11	Sondre Oddvoll Bøe	Norway	171.15	12	59.46	12	111.69
12	Andrei Lazukin	Russia	168.54	10	63.23	13	105.31
13	Matthew Samuels	South Africa	164.18	13	49.04	10	115.14
14	András Csernoch	Hungary	133.98	14	48.52	14	85.46

=== Ladies ===
Rank	Name	Nation	Total points	SP		FS	
1	Anna Shcherbakova	Russia	218.20	3	67.73	1	150.47
2	Elizaveta Tuktamysheva	Russia	214.38	1	73.66	2	140.72
3	You Young	South Korea	200.89	2	70.47	3	130.42
4	Kim Ye-lim	South Korea	182.60	5	65.65	5	116.95
5	Starr Andrews	United States	181.18	4	66.38	6	114.80
6	Sofia Samodurova	Russia	179.65	8	53.82	4	125.83
7	Lucrezia Beccari	Italy	167.94	7	55.16	7	112.78
8	Wakaba Higuchi	Japan	164.37	9	52.33	8	112.04
9	Jenni Saarinen	Finland	161.64	6	57.66	9	103.98
10	Valentina Matos	Spain	141.32	10	50.15	10	91.17
11	Megan Wessenberg	United States	135.72	14	44.76	11	90.96
12	Natasha McKay	United Kingdom	133.88	11	49.09	12	84.79
13	Greta Morkytė	Lithuania	129.82	13	47.00	13	82.82
14	Josefin Taljegård	Sweden	129.56	12	47.24	14	82.32
15	Sophia Schaller	Austria	120.08	15	38.76	15	81.32
16	Klara Stepanova	Czech Republic	111.79	16	36.86	16	74.93
17	Romana Kaiser	Liechtenstein	96.81	17	34.93	17	61.88

=== Ice dance ===
Rank	Name	Nation	Total points	RD		FD	
1	Charlène Guignard / Marco Fabbri	Italy	202.10	1	79.47	1	122.63
2	Laurence Fournier Beaudry / Nikolaj Sørensen	Canada	189.36	2	79.11	2	110.25
3	Alexandra Nazarova / Maxim Nikitin	Ukraine	172.98	4	68.51	4	104.47
4	Anastasia Shpilevaya / Grigory Smirnov	Russia	170.62	6	67.04	5	103.58
5	Caroline Green / Michael Parsons	United States	170.53	7	65.11	3	105.42
6	Allison Reed / Saulius Ambrulevičius	Lithuania	167.48	3	69.22	6	98.26
7	Marjorie Lajoie / Zachary Lagha	Canada	165.71	5	67.94	7	97.77
8	Chiara Calderone / Pietro Papetti	Italy	160.38	9	62.73	8	97.65
9	Adelina Galyavieva / Louis Thauron	France	159.93	8	64.43	9	95.50
10	Robynne Tweedale / Joseph Buckland	United Kingdom	150.90	10	61.55	12	89.35
11	Yuka Orihara / Juho Pirinen	Finland	148.48	11	57.94	10	90.54
12	Jasmine Tessari / Francesco Fioretti	Italy	141.63	12	51.55	11	90.08
13	Ekaterina Mironova / Evgeni Ustenko	Russia	115.91	13	42.65	13	73.26
14	India Nette / Eron Westwood	Australia	99.38	14	37.35	14	62.03
WD	Juulia Turkkila / Matthias Versluis	Finland	withdrew	withdrew from competition			
