= Morisi Kvitelashvili =

Russian-Georgian figure skater

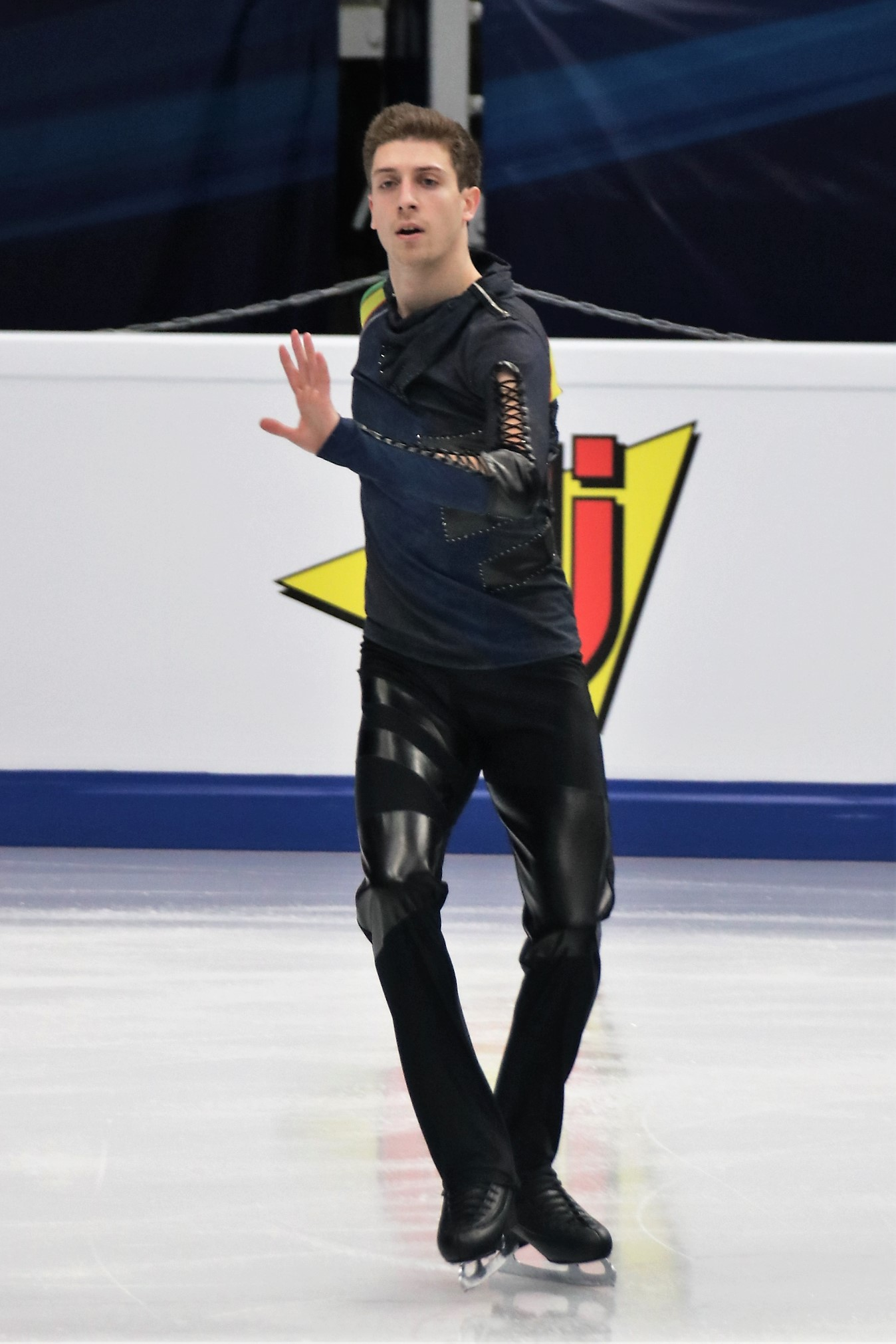
- Kvitelashvili at the 2018 European Championships

Personal information
- Native name: ყვითელაშვილი
- Full name: Morisi Mikhailovich Kvitelashvili
- Other names: Moris
- Born: 17 March 1995 (age 31) Moscow, Russia
- Height: 1.82 m (6 ft 0 in)

Figure skating career
- Country: Georgia (2016–23); Russia (until 2016)
- Coach: Lorenzo Magri, Eteri Tutberidze, Sergei Dudakov, Daniil Gleikhengauz, Angelina Turenko, Eva Martinek
- Skating club: Young Goose Academy, Egna-Neumarkt
- Began skating: 1999
- Retired: June 5, 2023
Medal record
Representing Georgia
European Championships
| Bronze medal – third place | 2020 Graz | Men's singles |
Winter Universiade
| Bronze medal – third place | 2019 Krasnoyarsk | Singles |

Morisi Mikhailovich Kvitelashvili (Georgian: მორის ყვითელაშვილი, pronounced [moɾis qʼʷitʰelaʃʷili]; Russian: Морис Михайлович Квителашвили, born 17 March 1995) is a retired Russian-Georgian figure skater who represented Georgia. He is the 2020 European bronze medalist, a three-time Rostelecom Cup medalist (including gold in 2021), a five-time Challenger series medalist (including gold at the 2017 CS Golden Spin of Zagreb), and the 2018 Georgian national champion.

Representing Russia, Kvitelashvili is the 2015 CS Mordovian Ornament bronze medalist. On the junior level, he is the 2013 JGP Czech Republic bronze medalist and the 2014 Russian junior national bronze medalist.

Kvitelashvili placed 24th at the 2018 Winter Olympics and progressed to 10th place at the 2022 Winter Olympics.

== Personal life ==
Kvitelashvili was born on 17 March 1995 in Moscow, Russia. His mother, a former competitive skater, and father are both originally from Tbilisi, Georgia.

As of 2018, he is a student at the Russian State University of Physical Education, Sport, Youth and Tourism in Moscow.

== Skating career ==
=== Early years ===
Kvitelashvili began learning to skate in 2000. His first coach was Elena Proskurina at CSKA Moscow.

He placed fourteenth at the 2011 Russian Junior Championships and eighteenth at the 2012 edition. He won the junior bronze medal at the 2012 NRW Trophy, his first international event.

=== 2013–2014 season ===
In 2013, Kvitelashvili was selected to compete on the ISU Junior Grand Prix (JGP); he placed fourth, 1.62 points behind bronze medalist Mikhail Kolyada, at his first event, which took place in September in Košice, Slovakia. The following month, he won the bronze medal at the JGP event in Ostrava, Czech Republic, having scored 17.76 points less than silver medalist Alexander Petrov and 16.7 more than Daniel Samohin. His senior international debut came in December, at the 2013 Winter Universiade in Trento, Italy, where he finished fifth.

=== 2014–2015 season: Grand Prix debut ===
Making his ISU Challenger Series (CS) debut, Kvitelashvili placed fifth at the Lombardia Trophy in September 2014. In November, he competed at the 2014 Rostelecom Cup, replacing the injured Kolyada; he finished twelfth at the event, the first senior Grand Prix (GP) assignment of his career. After placing eighth at the 2015 Russian Championships, he was sent to his second Winter Universiade and finished seventh at the competition, held in February 2015 in Granada, Spain.

=== 2015–2016 season ===
Kvitelashvili won the bronze medal at the 2015 CS Mordovian Ornament in Saransk, Russia. He finished twelfth at his sole GP event, the 2015 Cup of China. In December 2015, he placed fifth in his final international event for Russia, the CS Golden Spin of Zagreb, and twelfth at the Russian Championships. In May 2016, he submitted a request to Russian skating officials to be released to compete for Georgia.

Kvitelashvili at the 2017 World Championships

=== 2016–2017 season: First season for Georgia ===
Kvitelashvili made his first international appearance for Georgia in December 2016 at the Santa Claus Cup in Hungary. He obtained the minimum technical scores required to compete at all ISU Championships and won the gold medal, ahead of fellow Georgian Irakli Maysuradze, by placing first in both segments. Ranked tenth in the short program and fourth in the free skate, he finished sixth overall at the 2017 European Championships, held in January in Ostrava, Czech Republic.

In March, Kvitelashvili placed nineteenth in the short, eleventh in the free, and thirteenth overall at the 2017 World Championships in Helsinki, Finland. Due to his placement, Georgia qualified a spot in the men's event at the 2018 Winter Olympics in Pyeongchang, South Korea.

=== 2017–2018 season: PyeongChang Olympics ===
Kvitelashvili competed at two Grand Prix events, placing fifth at the 2017 Rostelecom Cup and 6th at the 2017 Internationaux de France. He was invited to the Russian event as a replacement for Keiji Tanaka. He won medals at both of his Challenger Series events, taking silver at the 2017 CS Minsk-Arena Ice Star and gold at the 2017 CS Golden Spin of Zagreb.

In January, Kvitelashvili placed twelfth at the 2018 European Championships in Moscow. The following month, he served as Georgia's flag-bearer during the opening ceremony at the 2018 Winter Olympics in Pyeongchang, South Korea. He qualified for the free skate in men's singles and finished twenty-fourth overall.

Kvitelashvili performing at the 2018 Skate America

=== 2018–2019 season ===
Beginning the season at the 2018 Ondrej Nepela Trophy, Kvitelashvili placed fourth in the short program and third in the free skate, narrowly finishing fourth overall, less than half a point behind Keiji Tanaka. At his second Challenger event, the Finlandia Trophy, he placed fifth in the free skate and third in the free, taking the bronze medal overall. His first Grand Prix event of the season, 2018 Skate America, saw him place eighth overall after coming eleventh in the short program and seven in the free skate. At the 2018 Rostelecom Cup, he placed second in both programs to win the silver medal, his first Grand Prix medal.

Kvitelashvili placed tenth at the 2019 European Championships and finished the season with a thirteenth-place showing at the 2019 World Championships.

=== 2019–2020 season: Bronze at Europeans ===
Kvitelashvili at the 2019 Internationaux de France gala

Kvitelashvili was fourth to begin the season at the 2019 CS Ondrej Nepela Memorial before winning the Denis Ten Memorial Challenge.

At his first Grand Prix event of the season, Kvitelashvili placed fifth in both segments at the 2019 Internationaux de France, for fourth place overall. He was seventh at the 2019 Rostelecom Cup.

Kvitelashvili won the bronze medal at 2020 European Championships after placing fourth in the short program and third in the free program. Only 0.03 points away from winning the silver medal that went to Artur Danielian, he said he had "dreamed for a long time about this." He was the first Georgian man to win a medal at the European Championships.

Kvitelashvili was assigned to compete at the 2020 World Championships in Montreal, but these were cancelled due to the coronavirus pandemic.

Kvitelashvili at the 2020 Moscow VTB Arena Ice Show

=== 2020–2021 season ===
With the pandemic continuing to affect international travel, the ISU opted to run the Grand Prix primarily based on geographic location, and Kvitelashvili was assigned to compete at the 2020 Rostelecom Cup. He won the short program with a clean short program scoring slightly under one hundred points, in what was considered something of an upset. Fourth in the free skate, he took his second silver medal from Rostelecom. He said afterward that he was "happy how everything came together, even though not everything worked in the free skating."

Kvitelashvili placed fourteenth at the 2021 World Championships in Stockholm. As a result, one berth was qualified for Georgia at the 2022 Winter Olympics in Beijing.

=== 2021–2022 season: Beijing Olympics ===
Kvitelashvili began the Olympic season at the 2021 CS Lombardia Trophy, where he won the bronze medal. At his first Grand Prix assignment, the 2021 Skate Canada International, he placed last in the short program but fourth in the free skate, rising to sixth place overall. At his second assignment, the 2021 Rostelecom Cup, Kvitelashvili placed second in the short program with a new personal best score of 95.37, only 0.44 points behind segment leader Kazuki Tomono of Japan. He was third in the free skate, albeit with a new personal best, but this was sufficient for him to rise to first place, claiming his first Grand Prix gold medal. He said, "I have not really realized what I achieved here, but I think it will come in time. I will take great memories from this competition." He finished the fall season with sixth place at the 2021 CS Golden Spin of Zagreb.

At the 2022 European Championships, Kvitelashvili finished in sixth place.

Named to the Georgian Olympic team for the second time, Kvitelashvili began the 2022 Winter Olympics as the Georgian entry in the men's short program of the Olympic team event. Despite a rough triple Axel landing, he placed fourth in the segment, securing seven points for the Georgian team. Team Georgia did not advance to the second stage of the competition and finished sixth. Turning to the men's event, Kvitelashvili skated a clean short program and finished fifth in that segment. Eleventh in the free skate, he finished tenth overall.

Days after the Olympics concluded, Vladimir Putin ordered an invasion of Ukraine, as a result of which the International Skating Union banned all Russian and Belarusian skaters from competing at the 2022 World Championships. In addition, both Nathan Chen and Yuzuru Hanyu were absent due to injury, and as a result, the field was considered more open than typically the case. Kvitelashvili was able to attend, but his Russian coaches were not. He placed seventh in the short program after stepping out of his quad Salchow, but rose to fifth in the free skate and finished a career-best fourth overall, 5.35 points behind bronze medalist Vincent Zhou of the United States.

=== 2022–2023 season ===
In advance of the new season, Kvitelashvili opted to end his nearly decade-long association with coach Eteri Tutberidze, moving to Italy to train under Lorenzo Magri. He won the silver medal at the 2022 CS Finlandia Trophy in his inaugural outing with his new team, before turning to the Grand Prix, where he finished eighth at the 2022 MK John Wilson Trophy. He was twelfth at the 2022 Grand Prix of Espoo.

Kvitelashvili finished sixteenth at the 2023 European Championships, and twentieth at the 2023 World Championships.

On June 5, 2023, it was announced that he had retired. He subsequently appeared in the Japan Open later that fall, as part of Team Europe, coming sixth of six men competing.

=== 2024–2025 season ===
In April 2025, Kvitelashvili came out of retirement to compete for Team Georgia at the 2025 World Team Trophy. He placed twelfth in the men's singles event and Team Georgia finished in sixth place overall.

== Programs ==
| Season | Short program | Free skating | Exhibition |
|---|---|---|---|
| 2024–25 | Tout l'univers by Gjon's Tears choreo. by Daniil Gleikhengauz, Alexei Zheleznikov | Fly Me to the Moon; My Way; I'm Gonna Live Till I Die performed by Frank Sinatra choreo. by Daniil Gleikhengauz, Alexei Zheleznikov | |
| 2022–2023 | Way Down We Go; Break My Baby by Kaleo choreo. by Daniil Gleikhengauz, Alexei Zheleznikov | Elvis; Suspicious Minds by Elvis Presley; Trouble by Elvis Presley performed by Austin Butler; If I Can Dream by Elvis Presley; Tutti Frutti by Little Richard performed by Les Greene choreo. by Daniil Gleikhengauz, Alexei Zheleznikov | The Mask by Randy Edelman; I Believe I Can Fly by R. Kelly; What Is Love by Haddaway |
| 2021–2022 | Tout l'univers by Gjon's Tears choreo. by Daniil Gleikhengauz, Alexei Zheleznikov | Fly Me to the Moon; My Way; I'm Gonna Live Till I Die performed by Frank Sinatra choreo. by Daniil Gleikhengauz, Alexei Zheleznikov | Friend Like Me (from Aladdin) performed by Will Smith |
| 2020–2021 | Amsterdam by Jacques Brel choreo. by Daniil Gleikhengauz | E lucevan le stelle; Execution and Finale (from Tosca) by Giacomo Puccini choreo. by Daniil Gleikhengauz | Friend Like Me (from Aladdin) performed by Will Smith |
| 2019–2020 | Always Watching You by Peter Cincotti choreo. by Daniil Gleikhengauz | Confessa by Adriano Celentano choreo. by Daniil Gleikhengauz | |
| 2018–2019 | Bloodstream by Tokio Myers choreo. by Daniil Gleikhengauz | Mozart, l'opéra rock choreo. by Daniil Gleikhengauz | Radioactive; Dream; Believer by Imagine Dragons |
| 2017–2018 | Feeling Good performed by Michael Bublé | Radioactive; Dream; Believer by Imagine Dragons | Katchi by Nick Waterhouse |
| 2015–2017 | I Believe I Can Fly by R. Kelly; What Is Love by Haddaway | Sixteen Tons performed by The Platters; Hogfat Blues by Stan Kenton; I Put A Spell On You performed by Garou | |
| 2014–2015 | Interview with the Vampire by Elliot Goldenthal | Blues for Elise by Wolf Hoffmann; After Dark by Tito & Tarantula; Blue Jean Blues by ZZ Top; Looking for a Fox by Dan Aykroyd, John Goodman, Blues Brothers Band | |
| 2013–2014 | Interview with the Vampire by Elliot Goldenthal | Sherlock Holmes by Hans Zimmer | |

== Competitive highlights ==
GP: Grand Prix; CS: Challenger Series; JGP: Junior Grand Prix

Kvitelashvili at the 2018 Rostelecom Cup

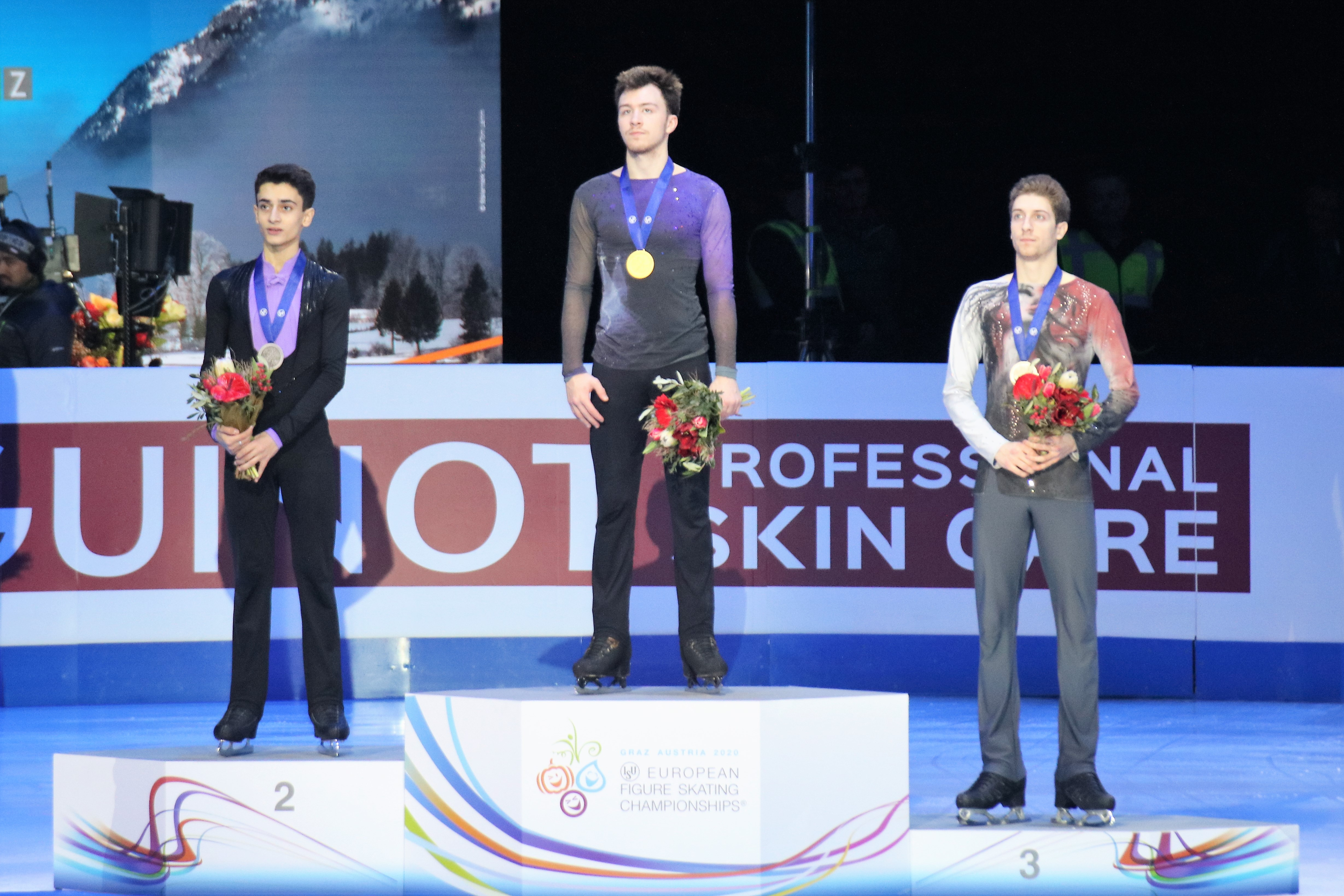
Kvitelashvili alongside medalists at the 2020 European Figure Skating Championships

=== For Georgia ===
International
| Event | 16–17 | 17–18 | 18–19 | 19–20 | 20–21 | 21–22 | 22–23 | 23–24 | 24–25 |
|---|---|---|---|---|---|---|---|---|---|
| Olympics | | 24th | | | | 10th | | | |
| Worlds | 13th | 26th | 13th | C | 14th | 4th | 20th | | |
| Europeans | 6th | 12th | 10th | 3rd | | 6th | 16th | | |
| GP Finland | | | | | | | 12th | | |
| GP France | | 6th | | 4th | | | | | |
| GP Rostelecom Cup | | 5th | 2nd | 7th | 2nd | 1st | | | |
| GP Skate America | | | 8th | | | | | | |
| GP Skate Canada | | | | | | 6th | | | |
| GP Wilson Trophy | | | | | | | 8th | | |
| CS Finlandia | | | 3rd | | | | 2nd | | |
| CS Golden Spin | | 1st | | 2nd | | 8th | | | |
| CS Lombardia | | | | 4th | | 3rd | | | |
| CS Ice Star | | 2nd | | | | | | | |
| CS Ondrej Nepela | | | 4th | | | | | | |
| Bosphorus Cup | | | 1st | | | | | | |
| Denis Ten Memorial | | | | 1st | | | | | |
| Int. Challenge Cup | 3rd | | | | 7th | | | | |
| Santa Claus Cup | 1st | | | | | | | | |
| Shanghai Trophy | | 2nd | | | | | | | |
| Winter Universiade | | | 3rd | | | | | | |
National
| Georgian Champ. | | 1st | | | | | | | |
Team Events
| Olympics | | | | | | 6th T | | | |
| World Team Trophy | | | | | | | | | 6th T 12th P |
| Japan Open | | | | | | | | 3rd T 6th P | |

=== For Russia ===
International
| Event | 10–11 | 11–12 | 12–13 | 13–14 | 14–15 | 15–16 |
|---|---|---|---|---|---|---|
| GP Cup of China | | | | | | 12th |
| GP Rostelecom Cup | | | | | 12th | |
| CS Golden Spin | | | | | 5th | 5th |
| CS Lombardia | | | | | 5th | |
| CS Mordovian | | | | | | 3rd |
| Winter Universiade | | | | 5th | 7th | |
International: Junior
| JGP Czech Republic | | | | 3rd | | |
| JGP Slovakia | | | | 4th | | |
| NRW Trophy | | | 3rd | | | |
National
| Russian Champ. | | | | 15th | 8th | 12th |
| Russian Junior Champ. | 14th | 8th | 14th | 3rd | | |

== Detailed results ==
Small medals for short and free programs awarded only at ISU Championships.

2024–25 season
| Date | Event | SP | FS | Total |
| April 17–20, 2025 | 2025 World Team Trophy | 12; 59.54 | 12; 120.27 | 6T/12P; 179.81 |
2022–23 season
| Date | Event | SP | FS | Total |
| March 22–26, 2023 | 2023 World Championships | 21; 73.05 | 20; 139.27 | 20; 212.32 |
| January 25–29, 2023 | 2023 European Championships | 16; 70.55 | 16; 124.04 | 16; 194.59 |
| November 25–27, 2022 | 2022 Grand Prix of Espoo | 12; 62.42 | 9; 134.38 | 12; 196.80 |
| November 11–13, 2022 | 2022 MK John Wilson Trophy | 12; 56.42 | 6; 138.83 | 8; 195.25 |
| October 4–9, 2022 | 2022 CS Finlandia Trophy | 2; 80.16 | 2; 151.14 | 2; 231.30 |
2021–22 season
| Date | Event | SP | FS | Total |
| March 21–27, 2022 | 2022 World Championships | 7; 92.61 | 5; 179.42 | 4; 272.03 |
| February 8–10, 2022 | 2022 Winter Olympics | 5; 97.98 | 11; 170.64 | 10; 268.62 |
| February 4–7, 2022 | 2022 Winter Olympics – Team event | 4; 92.37 | — | 6T |
| January 10–16, 2022 | 2022 European Championships | 4; 92.76 | 8; 161.15 | 6; 253.91 |
| December 7–11, 2021 | 2021 CS Golden Spin of Zagreb | 22; 58.53 | 3; 168.08 | 8; 226.61 |
| November 26–28, 2021 | 2021 Rostelecom Cup | 2; 95.37 | 3; 170.96 | 1; 266.33 |
| October 29–31, 2021 | 2021 Skate Canada International | 12; 71.60 | 4; 161.27 | 6; 232.87 |
| September 10–12, 2021 | 2021 CS Lombardia Trophy | 4; 76.52 | 2; 159.66 | 3; 236.18 |
2020–21 season
| Date | Event | SP | FS | Total |
| March 22–28, 2021 | 2021 World Championships | 21; 74.66 | 12; 157.15 | 14; 231.81 |
| February 26–28, 2021 | 2021 Challenge Cup | 6; 69.94 | 7; 135.18 | 7; 205.12 |
| November 20–22, 2020 | 2020 Rostelecom Cup | 1; 99.56 | 4; 176.24 | 2; 275.80 |
2019–20 season
| January 20–26, 2020 | 2020 European Championships | 4; 82.77 | 3; 163.94 | 3; 246.71 |
| December 4–7, 2019 | 2019 CS Golden Spin of Zagreb | 2; 81.10 | 4; 155.55 | 2; 236.65 |
| November 15–17, 2019 | 2019 Rostelecom Cup | 9; 75.87 | 5; 161.72 | 7; 237.59 |
| November 1–3, 2019 | 2019 Internationaux de France | 5; 78.79 | 5; 157.59 | 4; 236.38 |
| October 9–12, 2019 | 2019 Denis Ten Memorial Challenge | 1; 88.00 | 1; 156.98 | 1; 244.98 |
| September 13–15, 2019 | 2019 CS Lombardia Trophy | 4; 74.15 | 4; 146.81 | 4; 220.96 |
2018–19 season
| Date | Event | SP | FS | Total |
| March 18–24, 2019 | 2019 World Championships | 12; 82.67 | 13; 158.07 | 13; 240.74 |
| March 7–9, 2019 | 2019 Winter Universiade | 5; 82.71 | 2; 175.31 | 3; 258.02 |
| 21–27 January 2019 | 2019 European Championships | 15; 73.04 | 7; 146.75 | 10; 219.79 |
| Nov. 27 – Dec. 1, 2018 | 2018 Bosphorus Cup | 1; 78.66 | 1; 142.07 | 1; 220.73 |
| November 16–18, 2018 | 2018 Rostelecom Cup | 2; 89.94 | 2; 158.64 | 2; 248.58 |
| October 19–21, 2018 | 2018 Skate America | 11; 68.58 | 7; 136.54 | 8; 205.12 |
| October 4–7, 2018 | 2018 CS Finlandia Trophy | 5; 77.52 | 3; 153.67 | 3; 231.19 |
| September 19–22, 2018 | 2018 CS Ondrej Nepela Trophy | 4; 76.49 | 3; 145.14 | 4; 221.63 |
2017–18 season
| Date | Event | SP | FS | Total |
| March 19–25, 2018 | 2018 World Championships | 26; 67.01 | | 26; 67.01 |
| February 16–17, 2018 | 2018 Winter Olympics | 22; 76.56 | 24; 128.01 | 24; 204.57 |
| January 15–21, 2018 | 2018 European Championships | 7; 76.24 | 14; 133.73 | 12; 210.47 |
| December 6–9, 2017 | 2017 CS Golden Spin of Zagreb | 6; 76.24 | 1; 160.34 | 1; 236.58 |
| November 17–19, 2017 | 2017 Internationaux de France | 4; 86.98 | 8; 153.52 | 6; 240.50 |
| October 26–29, 2017 | 2017 CS Minsk-Arena Ice Star | 2; 78.28 | 3; 149.03 | 2; 227.31 |
| October 20–22, 2017 | 2017 Rostelecom Cup | 8; 80.67 | 5; 169.59 | 5; 250.26 |
2016–17 season
| Date | Event | SP | FS | Total |
| 29 March – 2 April 2017 | 2017 World Championships | 19; 76.34 | 11; 162.90 | 13; 239.24 |
| 25–29 January 2017 | 2017 European Championships | 10; 76.85 | 4; 161.35 | 6; 238.20 |
2015–16 season
| Date | Event | SP | FS | Total |
| 24–27 December 2015 | 2016 Russian Championships | 13; 69.26 | 12; 139.37 | 12; 208.63 |
| 2–5 December 2015 | 2015 Golden Spin of Zagreb | 6; 68.55 | 5; 144.43 | 5; 212.98 |
| November 6–8, 2015 | 2015 Cup of China | 11; 66.92 | 12; 125.16 | 12; 192.10 |
| 16–19 October 2015 | 2015 Mordovian Ornament | 3; 75.79 | 3; 154.45 | 3; 230.24 |
2014–15 season
| Date | Event | SP | FS | Total |
| February 4–8, 2015 | 2015 Winter Universiade | 14; 55.07 | 4; 138.27 | 7; 193.34 |
| 24–27 December 2014 | 2015 Russian Championships | 8; 74.37 | 9; 133.03 | 8; 207.40 |
| December 4–7, 2014 | 2014 Golden Spin of Zagreb | 7; 66.16 | 5; 141.61 | 5; 207.77 |
| November 14–16, 2014 | 2014 Rostelecom Cup | 12; 62.24 | 12; 112.01 | 12; 174.25 |
| 18–21 September 24 | 2014 Lombardia Trophy | 4; 72.12 | 7; 129.02 | 5; 201.14 |
