= Roman Galay =

Finnish figure skater

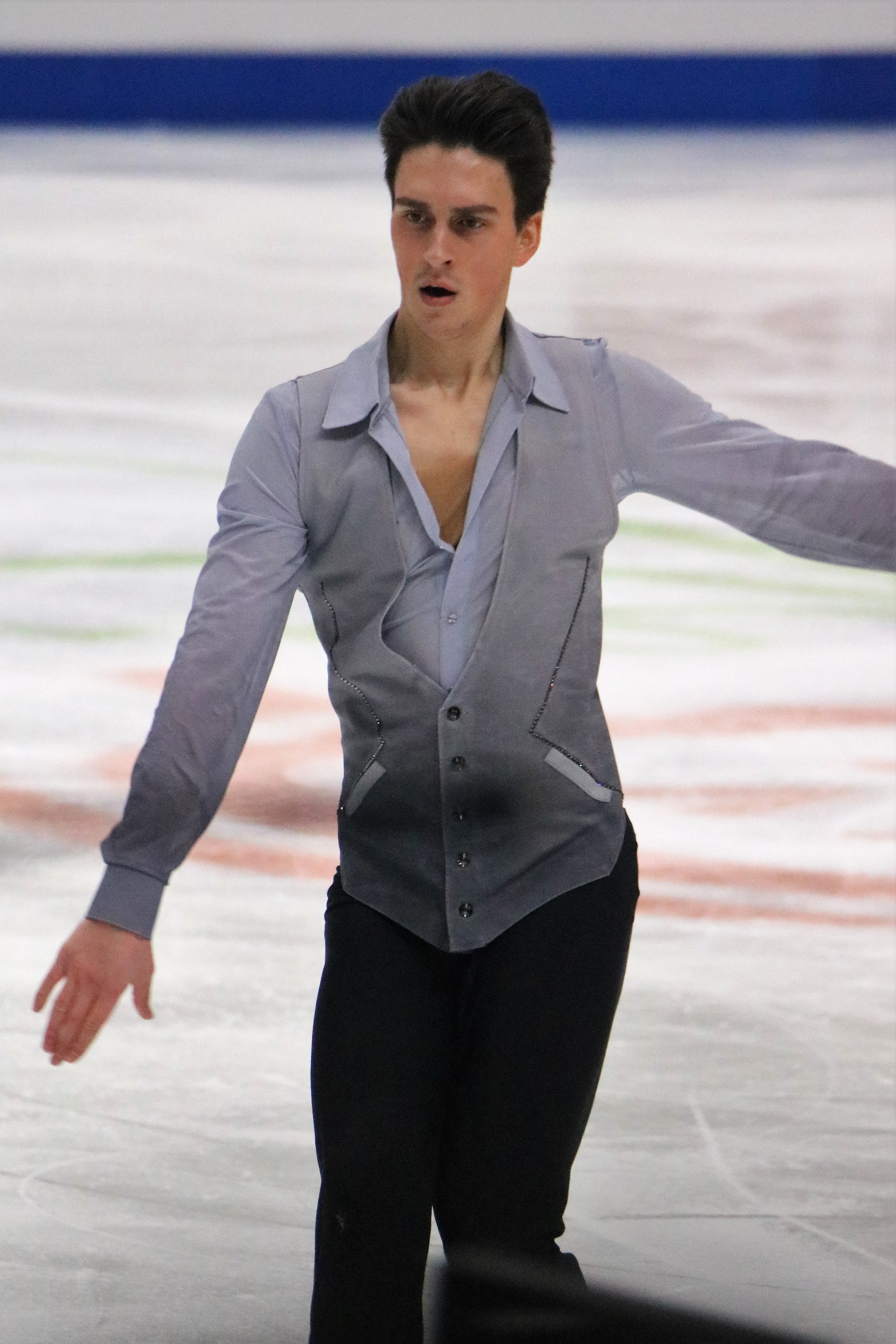

Personal information
- Born: 20 August 1998 (age 27) St. Petersburg, Russia
- Home town: Lappeenranta, Finland
- Height: 1.80 m (5 ft 11 in)

Figure skating career
- Country: Finland
- Discipline: Men's singles
- Began skating: 2003
- Retired: 2021

Medal record
Finnish Championships
Gold medal – first place	2019 Kouvola	Singles
Gold medal – first place	2020 Vantaa	Singles
Silver medal – second place	2016 Mikkeli	Singles
Bronze medal – third place	2018 Kouvola	Singles

Roman Galay (born 20 August 1998) is a Finnish former figure skater. He is a two-time Finnish national champion (2019, 2020). He has competed at a total of five ISU Championships, at two European and three World Junior Championships.

== Personal life ==
He married Russian-born Georgian figure skater Anastasiia Gubanova on 26 July 2024.

== Early life and career ==
Born in Saint Petersburg, Russia, Galay moved to Finland in the late 2000s, and he later received Finnish citizenship. He lived in Lappeenranta, Finland, when he was young, then he moved to the Lahti region after middle school. He trained in Vierumäki where he completed both a physical education instructor's degree and high school.

In 2018 he relocated to Saint Petersburg where he was coached by Evgeni Rukavicin. Galay won Finnish Figure Skating Championships the following two years.

== Competitive highlights ==
- JGP – Event of the ISU Junior Grand Prix Series
- CS – Event of the ISU Challenger Series
- WD – Withdrew from competition

Competition placements at senior level
Season	2015–16	2017–18	2018–19	2019–20
European Championships			32nd	31st
Finnish Championships	2nd	3rd	1st	1st
CS Finlandia Trophy	13th		21st	8th
CS Lombardia Trophy				6th
CS Tallinn Trophy			16th	
CS Warsaw Cup				7th
Bavarian Open		8th		
Dragon Trophy	1st			
Jégvirág Cup			WD	
Nordic Championships	5th	7th	4th	
NRW Trophy	5th			
Skate Helena	2nd			
Winter Universiade			19th	

Competition placements at junior level
Season	2012–13	2013–14	2014–15	2015–16	2016–17	2017–18
World Junior Championships			36th	33rd		35th
Finnish Championships	4th	1st	1st			
JGP Austria				6th		
JGP Czech Republic		19th				
JGP Estonia			17th			
JGP Poland				12th		
JGP Slovenia			17th			
Bavarian Open		11th				
European Youth Olympic Festival			9th			
Lombardia Trophy					1st	
Nordic Championships			1st			
Tallinn Trophy		1st	3rd			

== Detailed results ==
ISU personal best scores in the +5/-5 GOE System
Segment	Type	Score	Event
Total	TSS	203.52	2019 CS Lombardia Trophy
Short program	TSS	67.93	2019 CS Warsaw Cup
Short program	TES	35.38	2019 CS Warsaw Cup
Short program	PCS	32.55	2019 CS Warsaw Cup
Free skating	TSS	136.48	2019 CS Lombardia Trophy
Free skating	TES	69.48	2019 CS Lombardia Trophy
Free skating	PCS	67.92	2019 CS Finlandia Trophy

ISU personal best scores in the +3/-3 GOE System
Segment	Type	Score	Event
Total	TSS	171.31	2015 JGP Austria
Short program	TSS	59.59	2015 JGP Austria
Short program	TES	33.34	2015 JGP Austria
Short program	PCS	26.86	2018 World Junior Championships
Free skating	TSS	111.72	2015 JGP Austria
Free skating	TES	53.36	2015 JGP Austria
Free skating	PCS	58.36	2015 JGP Austria
