= Lombardia Trophy =

International figure skating competition

- Status: Active
- Genre: ISU Challenger Series
- Frequency: Annual
- Venue: IceLab Bergamo Palaghiaccio
- Location: Bergamo
- Country: Italy
- Inaugurated: 2008
- Previous event: 2025 Lombardia Trophy
- Next event: 2026 Lombardia Trophy
- Organizer: Italian Ice Sports Federation

The Lombardia Trophy is an annual figure skating competition sanctioned by the International Skating Union (ISU), organized and hosted by the Italian Ice Sports Federation (Italian: Federazione Italiana Sport del Ghiaccio). The competition debuted in 2008 in Sesto San Giovanni, and when the ISU launched the Challenger Series in 2014, the Lombardia Trophy was one of the inaugural competitions. The event is dedicated to the memory of Anna Grandolfi, the founder of Sesto Ice Skate, who died in 2015.

Medals are awarded in men's singles, women's singles, pair skating, and ice dance, although each discipline may not necessarily be held every year, and when the event is part of the Challenger Series, skaters earn points towards the World Standings and Season's World Ranking based on their results. Shoma Uno of Japan currently holds the record for the most wins at the Lombardia Trophy titles in men's singles (with three), while Sara Conti and Niccolò Macii of Italy hold the record in pair skating (with four), and Charlène Guignard and Marco Fabbri, also of Italy, hold the record in ice dance (with eight).

== History ==
The inaugural edition of the Lombardia Trophy was held in 2008 in Sesto San Giovanni. Originally, it only featured events in men's and women's singles. The Lombardia Trophy is dedicated in memory of Anna Grandolfi, who founded the Sesto Ice Skate skating club in 2001 and served as the club's president for fifteen years, before she died in 2015. From 2013 to 2015, the competition was held in Sesto San Giovanni; since 2016, it has been held in Bergamo.

The ISU Challenger Series was introduced in 2014. It is a series of international figure skating competitions sanctioned by the International Skating Union and organized by ISU member nations. The objective is to ensure consistent organization and structure within a series of international competitions linked together, providing opportunities for senior-level skaters to compete at the international level and also earn points towards the World Standings and Season's World Ranking. When an event is held as part of the Challenger Series, it must host at least three of the four disciplines (men's singles, women's singles, pair skating, and ice dance) and representatives from at least ten different ISU member nations. The minimum number of entrants required for each discipline is eight skaters each in men's singles and women's singles, five teams in pair skating, and six teams in ice dance. Each ISU member nation is eligible to enter up to three skaters or teams per discipline in each competition, although the Italian Ice Sports Federation may enter an unlimited number of entrants in their own event. The Lombardia Trophy was a Challenger Series event in 2014, from 2016 through 2019, and from 2021 through 2025. No competition was held in 2020 due to the COVID-19 pandemic, although it had already been left off the slate of competitions for the 2020–21 ISU Challenger Series.

== Senior medalists ==
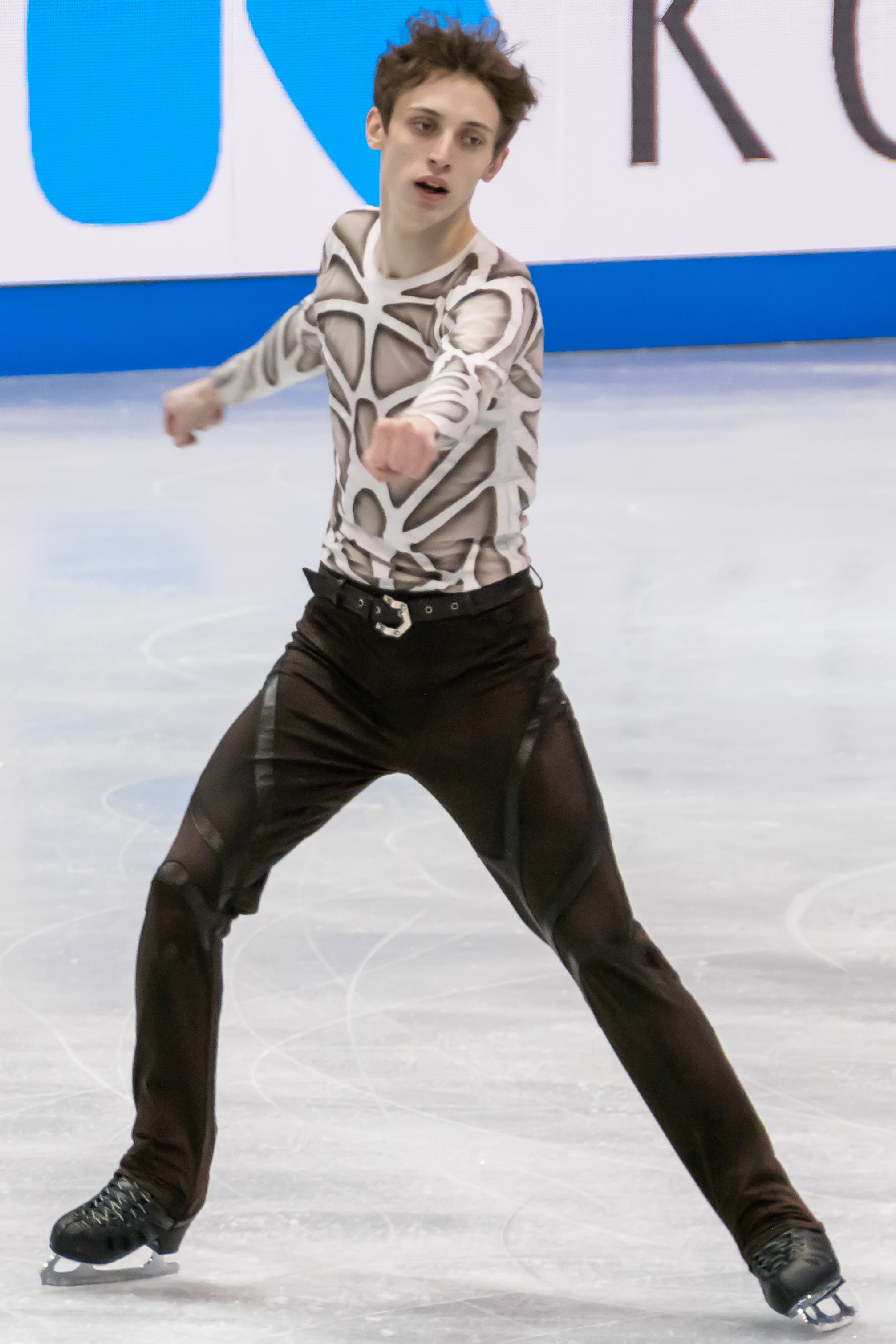
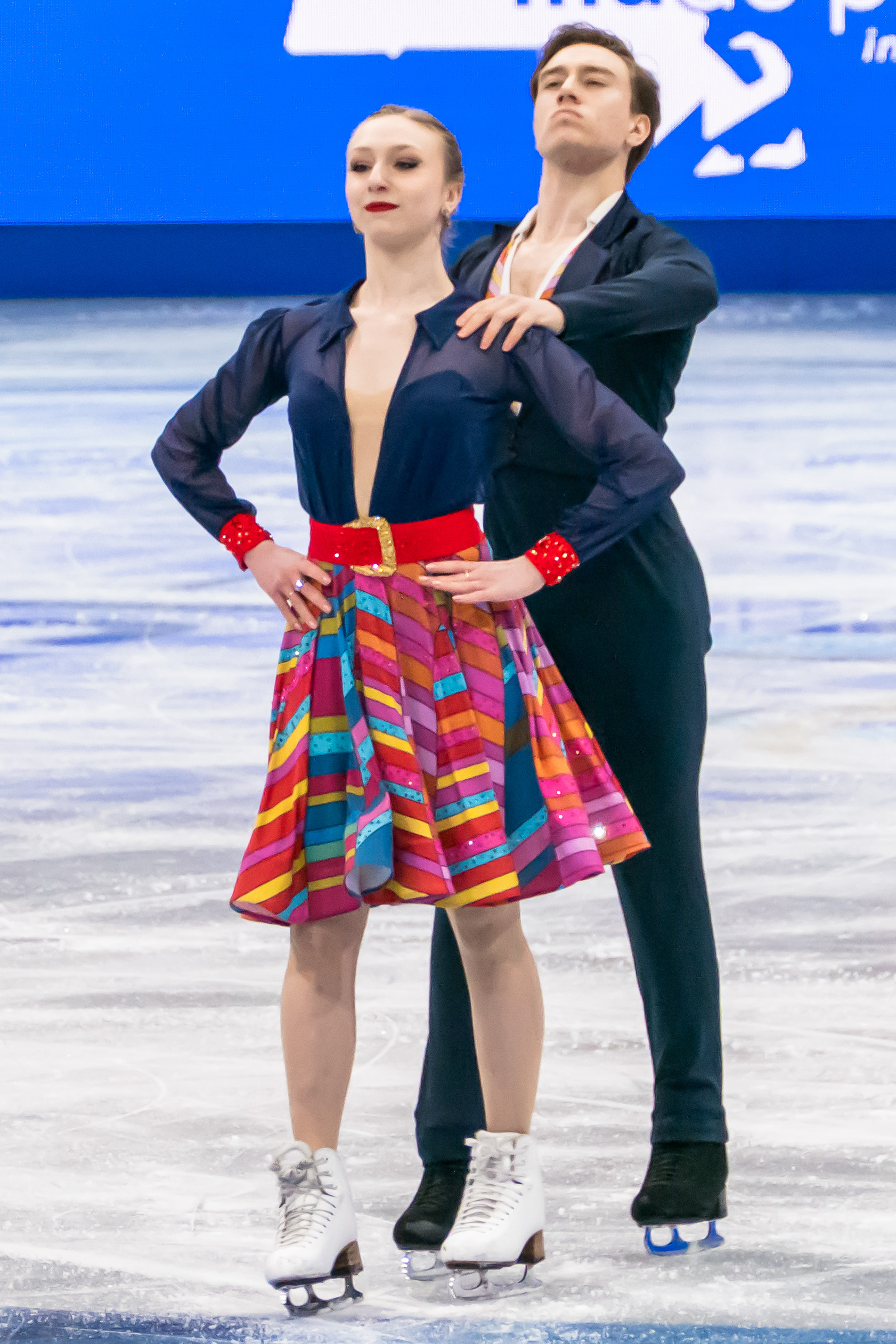
The 2026 Lombardia Trophy champions (from left to right): Mihhail Selevko of Estonia (men's singles); Niina Petrokina of Estonia (women's singles); and Kateřina Mrázková and Daniel Mrázek of the Czech Republic (ice dance)

CS: Challenger Series event

=== Men's singles ===
Senior men's event medalists
Year	Location	Gold	Silver	Bronze	Ref.
2008	Sesto San Giovanni	No senior-level competitors			
2009	Sesto San Giovanni	(United Kingdom) Thomas Paulson	(Italy) Luca Demattè	(Italy) Christian Rapis	
2010	Sesto San Giovanni	No men's competitors			
2011	Sesto San Giovanni				
2012	Sesto San Giovanni	(Italy) Saverio Giacomelli	(United Kingdom) David Richardson	(United Kingdom) Daniel Aggiano	
2013	Sesto San Giovanni	(Sweden) Alexander Majorov	(Philippines) Christopher Caluza	(Kazakhstan) Abzal Rakimgaliev	
2014 CS	Sesto San Giovanni	(United States) Richard Dornbush	(Japan) Takahito Mura	(Russia) Adian Pitkeev	
2015	Sesto San Giovanni	(France) Chafik Besseghier	(Czech Republic) Michal Březina	(France) Kévin Aymoz	
2016 CS	Bergamo	(Japan) Shoma Uno	(United States) Jason Brown	(United States) Max Aaron	
2017 CS	Bergamo	(Japan) Shoma Uno	(United States) Jason Brown	(Australia) Brendan Kerry	
2018 CS	Bergamo	(Japan) Shoma Uno	(Russia) Dmitri Aliev	(Russia) Andrei Lazukin	
2019 CS	Bergamo	(China) Jin Boyang	(Russia) Dmitri Aliev	(Italy) Matteo Rizzo	
2020	Bergamo	Competition cancelled due to the COVID-19 pandemic			
2021 CS	Bergamo	(Italy) Daniel Grassl	(France) Adam Siao Him Fa	(Georgia (country)) Morisi Kvitelashvili	
2022 CS	Bergamo	(France) Adam Siao Him Fa	(Japan) Koshiro Shimada	(Italy) Nikolaj Memola	
2023 CS	Bergamo	(Japan) Yuma Kagiyama	(Georgia (country)) Nika Egadze	(United States) Andrew Torgashev	
2024 CS	Bergamo	(United States) Ilia Malinin	(Japan) Yuma Kagiyama	(Japan) Shun Sato	
2025 CS	Bergamo	(United States) Ilia Malinin	(Japan) Yuma Kagiyama	(Italy) Nikolaj Memola	
2026 CS	Bergamo	(Estonia) Mihhail Selevko	(Individual Neutral Athletes) Matvei Vetlugin	(France) Corentin Spinar	

=== Women's singles ===
Senior women's event medalists
Year	Location	Gold	Silver	Bronze	Ref.
2008	Sesto San Giovanni	No senior-level competitors			
2009	Sesto San Giovanni	(Italy) Sofia Curci	(Czech Republic) Martina Boček	(Austria) Christina Grill	
2010	Sesto San Giovanni	(Italy) Sofia Curci	(Italy) Roberta Rodeghiero	(Czech Republic) Martina Boček	
2011	Sesto San Giovanni				
2012	Sesto San Giovanni	(Italy) Roberta Rodeghiero	(Italy) Micol Cristini	(Italy) Ilaria Nogaro	
2013	Sesto San Giovanni	(Italy) Valentina Marchei	(Germany) Sarah Hecken	(France) Anaïs Ventard	
2014 CS	Sesto San Giovanni	(Japan) Satoko Miyahara	(United States) Hannah Miller	(United States) Angela Wang	
2015	Sesto San Giovanni	(Italy) Roberta Rodeghiero	(Sweden) Joshi Helgesson	(Japan) Miyu Nakashio	
2016 CS	Bergamo	(Japan) Wakaba Higuchi	(South Korea) Kim Na-hyun	(United States) Mirai Nagasu	
2017 CS	Bergamo	(Russia) Alina Zagitova	(Japan) Wakaba Higuchi	(Italy) Carolina Kostner	
2018 CS	Bergamo	(Russia) Elizaveta Tuktamysheva	(Russia) Sofia Samodurova	(Japan) Mako Yamashita	
2019 CS	Bergamo	(Russia) Anna Shcherbakova	(Russia) Elizaveta Tuktamysheva	(South Korea) You Young	
2020	Bergamo	Competition cancelled due to the COVID-19 pandemic			
2021 CS	Bergamo	(United States) Alysa Liu	(Poland) Ekaterina Kurakova	(United States) Audrey Shin	
2022 CS	Bergamo	(Japan) Rinka Watanabe	(Japan) Kaori Sakamoto	(Poland) Ekaterina Kurakova	
2023 CS	Bergamo	(Georgia (country)) Anastasia Gubanova	(Japan) Hana Yoshida	(South Korea) Kim Chae-yeon	
2024 CS	Bergamo	(United States) Amber Glenn	(United States) Sarah Everhardt	(Japan) Kaori Sakamoto	
2025 CS	Bergamo	(Japan) Rion Sumiyoshi	(Japan) Ami Nakai	(United States) Sarah Everhardt	
2026 CS	Bergamo	(Estonia) Niina Petrokina	(South Korea) Shin Ji-a	(Italy) Lara Naki Gutmann	

=== Pairs ===
The pairs events at the 2021, 2022, and 2025 competitions were not part of the Challenger Series.

Senior pairs' event medalists
Year	Location	Gold	Silver	Bronze	Ref.
No pairs competitions prior to 2013
2013	Sesto San Giovanni	(Italy); Stefania Berton; Ondřej Hotárek	(Russia); Anastasia Martiusheva; Alexei Rogonov	(Russia); Katarina Gerboldt; Alexander Enbert	
2014 CS	Sesto San Giovanni	(United States); Haven Denney; Brandon Frazier	(Italy); Bianca Manacorda; Niccolò Macii	(Russia); Vera Bazarova; Andrei Deputat	
2015	Sesto San Giovanni	(Italy); Valentina Marchei; Ondřej Hotárek	(Lithuania); Goda Butkutė; Nikita Ermolaev	(France); Camille Mendoza; Pavel Kovalev	
2016 CS	Bergamo	(Italy); Nicole Della Monica; Matteo Guarise	(Italy); Valentina Marchei; Ondřej Hotárek	(Italy); Rebecca Ghilardi; Filippo Ambrosini	
2017 CS	Bergamo	(Russia); Natalia Zabiiako; Alexander Enbert	(Italy); Nicole Della Monica; Matteo Guarise	(Italy); Valentina Marchei; Ondřej Hotárek	
2018 CS	Bergamo	(Russia); Natalia Zabiiako; Alexander Enbert	(Russia); Aleksandra Boikova; Dmitrii Kozlovskii	(Italy); Nicole Della Monica; Matteo Guarise	
2019	Bergamo	No pairs competition held			
2020	Bergamo	Competition cancelled due to the COVID-19 pandemic			
2021	Bergamo	(Italy); Nicole Della Monica; Matteo Guarise	(Spain); Laura Barquero; Marco Zandron	(Italy); Rebecca Ghilardi; Filippo Ambrosini	
2022	Bergamo	(Italy); Sara Conti; Niccolò Macii	(Italy); Irma Caldara; Riccardo Maglio	(Italy); Anna Valesi; Manuel Piazza	
2023 CS	Bergamo	(Italy); Sara Conti; Niccolò Macii	(Germany); Minerva Fabienne Hase; Nikita Volodin	(Germany); Annika Hocke; Robert Kunkel	
2024 CS	Bergamo	(Italy); Sara Conti; Niccolò Macii	(Japan); Riku Miura; Ryuichi Kihara	(Hungary); Maria Pavlova; Alexei Sviatchenko	
2025	Bergamo	(Italy); Sara Conti; Niccolò Macii	(Italy); Rebecca Ghilardi; Filippo Ambrosini	(Czech Republic); Anna Valesi; Martin Bidař	
2026	Bergamo	No pairs competition held			

=== Ice dance ===
Senior ice dance event medalists
Year	Location	Gold	Silver	Bronze	Ref.
No ice dance competitions prior to 2015
2015	Sesto San Giovanni	(Italy); Anna Cappellini; Luca Lanotte	(Italy); Charlène Guignard; Marco Fabbri	(Italy); Misato Komatsubara; Andrea Fabbri	
2016 CS	Bergamo	(Italy); Charlène Guignard; Marco Fabbri	(United Kingdom); Lilah Fear; Lewis Gibson	(Finland); Cecilia Törn; Jussiville Partanen	
2017 CS	Bergamo	(Italy); Charlène Guignard; Marco Fabbri	(Russia); Alla Loboda; Pavel Drozd	(Ukraine); Oleksandra Nazarova; Maxim Nikitin	
2018 CS	Bergamo	(Italy); Charlène Guignard; Marco Fabbri	(United States); Rachel Parsons; Michael Parsons	(Spain); Sara Hurtado; Kirill Khaliavin	
2019 CS	Bergamo	(Italy); Charlène Guignard; Marco Fabbri	(Canada); Laurence Fournier Beaudry; Nikolaj Sørensen	(Ukraine); Oleksandra Nazarova; Maxim Nikitin	
2020	Bergamo	Competition cancelled due to the COVID-19 pandemic			
2021 CS	Bergamo	(Italy); Charlène Guignard; Marco Fabbri	(Canada); Laurence Fournier Beaudry; Nikolaj Sørensen	(Spain); Sara Hurtado; Kirill Khaliavin	
2022 CS	Bergamo	(Italy); Charlène Guignard; Marco Fabbri	(Lithuania); Allison Reed; Saulius Ambrulevičius	(Czech Republic); Natálie Taschlerová; Filip Taschler	
2023 CS	Bergamo	(Italy); Charlène Guignard; Marco Fabbri	(Czech Republic); Natálie Taschlerová; Filip Taschler	(Georgia (country)); Maria Kazakova; Georgy Reviya	
2024 CS	Bergamo	(Italy); Charlène Guignard; Marco Fabbri	(United States); Annabelle Morozov; Jeffrey Chen	(United States); Leah Neset; Artem Markelov	
2025 CS	Bergamo	(United States); Eva Pate; Logan Bye	(Czech Republic); Kateřina Mrázková; Daniel Mrázek	(United States); Katarina Wolfkostin; Dimitry Tsarevski	
2026 CS	Bergamo	(Czech Republic); Kateřina Mrázková; Daniel Mrázek	(France); Evgeniia Lopareva; Geoffrey Brissaud	(United States); Emily Bratti; Ian Somerville	

== Junior medalists ==
=== Men's singles ===
Junior men's event medalists
Year	Location	Gold	Silver	Bronze	Ref.
2008	Sesto San Giovanni				
2009	Sesto San Giovanni	(Italy) Giorgio Settembrini	(Italy) Alessandro Pezzoli	(Italy) Cesare Bellomo	
2010	Sesto San Giovanni	(Italy) Antonio Panfili	(Italy) Nikita Revine	(Italy) Carlo Vittorio Palermo	
2011	Sesto San Giovanni				
2012	Sesto San Giovanni	(Canada) Bennet Toman	(Canada) Nicolas Nadeau	(Italy) Alberto Vanz	
2013	Sesto San Giovanni	(France) Kévin Aymoz	(Germany) Alexander Bjelde	(Italy) Matteo Rizzo	
2014	Sesto San Giovanni	(France) Kévin Aymoz	(Italy) Matteo Rizzo	(Czech Republic) Petr Kotlařík	
2015	Sesto San Giovanni	(Czech Republic) Petr Kotlařík	(Sweden) Illya Solomin	(Italy) Daniel Grassl	
2016	Bergamo	(Finland) Roman Galay	(Czech Republic) Petr Kotlařík	(Italy) Adrien Bannister	
No junior-level competitions since 2016

=== Women's singles ===
Junior women's event medalists
Year	Location	Gold	Silver	Bronze	Ref.
2008	Sesto San Giovanni				
2009	Sesto San Giovanni	(Italy) Carlotta Ortenzi	(Italy) Amelia Schwienbacher	(Italy) Silvia Lovison	
2010	Sesto San Giovanni	(Italy) Carol Bressanutti	(Italy) Giorgia Gravina	(Italy) Julia Bertinato	
2011	Sesto San Giovanni				
2012	Sesto San Giovanni	(Canada) Marianne Rioux Ouellet	(Canada) Sandrine Martin	(Italy) Victoria Manni	
2013	Sesto San Giovanni	(France) Nadjma Mahamoud	(Australia) Kailani Craine	(Germany) Minami Hanashiro	
2014	Sesto San Giovanni	(Australia) Kailani Craine	(South Korea) Yoon Eun-su	(Italy) Micol Cristini	
2015	Sesto San Giovanni	(South Korea) Yun Sun-min	(Sweden) Anastasia Schneider	(Switzerland) Shaline Ruegger	
2016	Bergamo	(South Korea) Kim Bo-young	(South Korea) Lee Min-young	(Italy) Lara Naki Gutmann	
No junior-level competitions since 2016

=== Pairs ===
Junior pairs' event medalists
Year	Location	Gold	Silver	Bronze	Ref.
2008	Sesto San Giovanni				
2009	Sesto San Giovanni	No junior pairs competitors			
2010	Sesto San Giovanni	(Italy); Carolina Gillespie; Luca Demattè	No other competitors		
2011	Sesto San Giovanni				
2012	Sesto San Giovanni	(Italy); Bianca Manacorda; Niccolò Macii	(United Kingdom); Robynne Tweedale; Steven Adcock	No other competitors	
2013	Sesto San Giovanni	(Germany); Julia Linckh; Konrad Hocker-Scholler	(Germany); Katharina Lesser; Viktor Kremke	No other competitors	
2014	Sesto San Giovanni	(Ukraine); Renata Ohanesian; Mark Bardei	(Italy); Irma Caldara; Edoardo Caputo	(Australia); Eliza Smyth; Jordan Dodds	
2015	Sesto San Giovanni	No junior pairs competitors			
2016	Bergamo	(Italy); Giulia Foresti; Leo Luca Sforza	(Italy); Irma Caldara; Edoardo Caputo	No other competitors	
No junior-level competitions since 2016

== Records ==
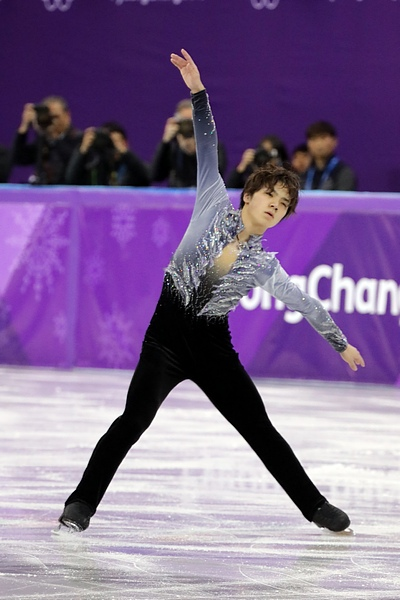
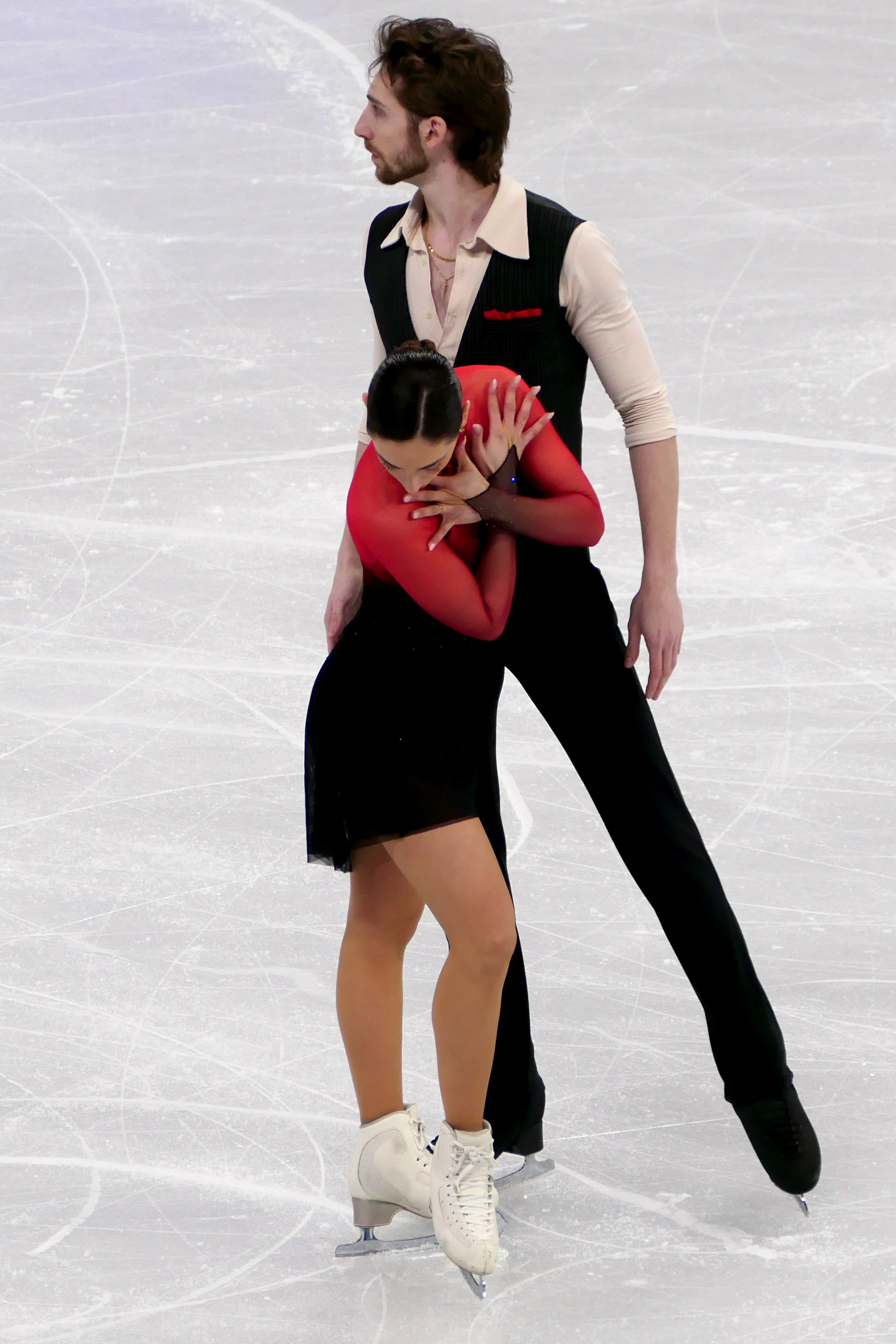
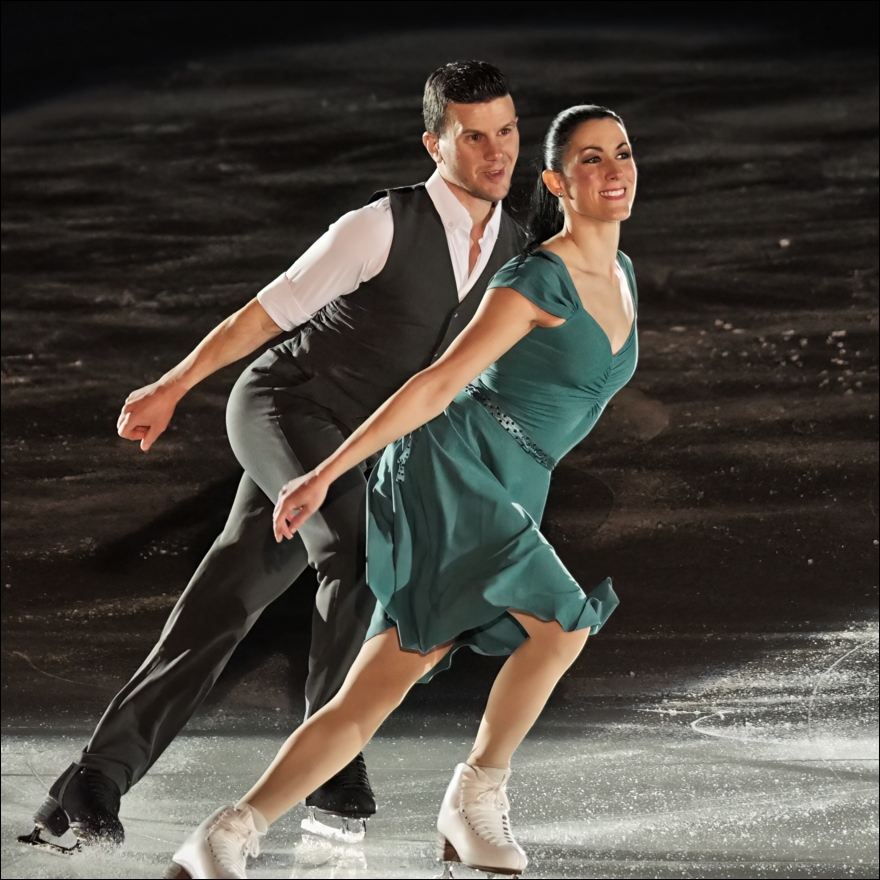
From left to right: Shoma Uno of Japan won three Lombardia Trophy titles in men's singles; Sara Conti and Niccolò Macii of Italy have won four Lombardia Trophy titles in pair skating; and Charlène Guignard and Marco Fabbri of Italy have won eight Lombardia Trophy titles in ice dance.

Records
Discipline	Most titles			
Discipline	Skater(s)	No.	Years	Ref.
Men's singles	(Japan); Shoma Uno	3	2016–18	
Women's singles	(Italy); Sofia Curci	2	2009–10	
Women's singles	(Italy); Roberta Rodeghiero	2	2012; 2015	
Pairs	(Italy); Sara Conti; Niccolò Macii	4	2022–25	
Ice dance	(Italy); Charlène Guignard; Marco Fabbri	8	2016–19; 2021–24	

== Cumulative medal count (senior medalists) ==
=== Men's singles ===
Total number of Lombardia Trophy medals in men's singles by nation
Rank	Nation	Gold	Silver	Bronze	Total
1	Japan	4	4	1	9
2	United States	3	2	2	7
3	Italy	2	1	4	7
4	France	2	1	2	5
5	Great Britain	1	1	1	3
6	China	1	0	0	1
6	Estonia	1	0	0	1
6	Sweden	1	0	0	1
9	Russia	0	2	2	4
10	Georgia	0	1	1	2
11	Czech Republic	0	1	0	1
11	Individual Neutral Athletes	0	1	0	1
11	Philippines	0	1	0	1
14	Australia	0	0	1	1
14	Kazakhstan	0	0	1	1
Totals (15 entries)		15	15	15	45

=== Women's singles ===
Total number of Lombardia Trophy medals in women's singles by nation
Rank	Nation	Gold	Silver	Bronze	Total
1	Italy	5	2	3	10
2	Japan	4	4	3	11
3	Russia	3	2	0	5
4	United States	2	2	4	8
5	Estonia	1	0	0	1
5	Georgia	1	0	0	1
7	South Korea	0	2	2	4
8	Czech Republic	0	1	1	2
8	Poland	0	1	1	2
10	Germany	0	1	0	1
10	Sweden	0	1	0	1
12	Austria	0	0	1	1
12	France	0	0	1	1
Totals (13 entries)		16	16	16	48

=== Pairs ===
Total number of Lombardia Trophy medals in pairs by nation
Rank	Nation	Gold	Silver	Bronze	Total
1	Italy	8	5	5	18
2	Russia	2	2	2	6
3	United States	1	0	0	1
4	Germany	0	1	1	2
5	Japan	0	1	0	1
5	Lithuania	0	1	0	1
5	Spain	0	1	0	1
8	Czech Republic	0	0	1	1
8	France	0	0	1	1
8	Hungary	0	0	1	1
Totals (10 entries)		11	11	11	33

=== Ice dance ===
Total number of Lombardia Trophy medals in ice dance by nation
Rank	Nation	Gold	Silver	Bronze	Total
1	Italy	9	1	1	11
2	United States	1	2	3	6
3	Czech Republic	1	2	1	4
4	Canada	0	2	0	2
5	France	0	1	0	1
5	Great Britain	0	1	0	1
5	Lithuania	0	1	0	1
5	Russia	0	1	0	1
9	Spain	0	0	2	2
9	Ukraine	0	0	2	2
11	Finland	0	0	1	1
11	Georgia	0	0	1	1
Totals (12 entries)		11	11	11	33

=== Total medals ===
Total number of Lombardia Trophy medals by nation
Rank	Nation	Gold	Silver	Bronze	Total
1	Italy	24	9	13	46
2	Japan	8	9	4	21
3	United States	7	6	9	22
4	Russia	5	7	4	16
5	France	2	2	4	8
6	Estonia	2	0	0	2
7	Czech Republic	1	4	3	8
8	Great Britain	1	2	1	4
9	Georgia	1	1	2	4
10	Sweden	1	1	0	2
11	China	1	0	0	1
12	South Korea	0	2	2	4
13	Germany	0	2	1	3
14	Canada	0	2	0	2
14	Lithuania	0	2	0	2
16	Spain	0	1	2	3
17	Poland	0	1	1	2
18	Individual Neutral Athletes	0	1	0	1
18	Philippines	0	1	0	1
20	Ukraine	0	0	2	2
21	Australia	0	0	1	1
21	Austria	0	0	1	1
21	Finland	0	0	1	1
21	Hungary	0	0	1	1
21	Kazakhstan	0	0	1	1
Totals (25 entries)		53	53	53	159
