= Filip Taschler =

Czech ice dancer (born 1999)

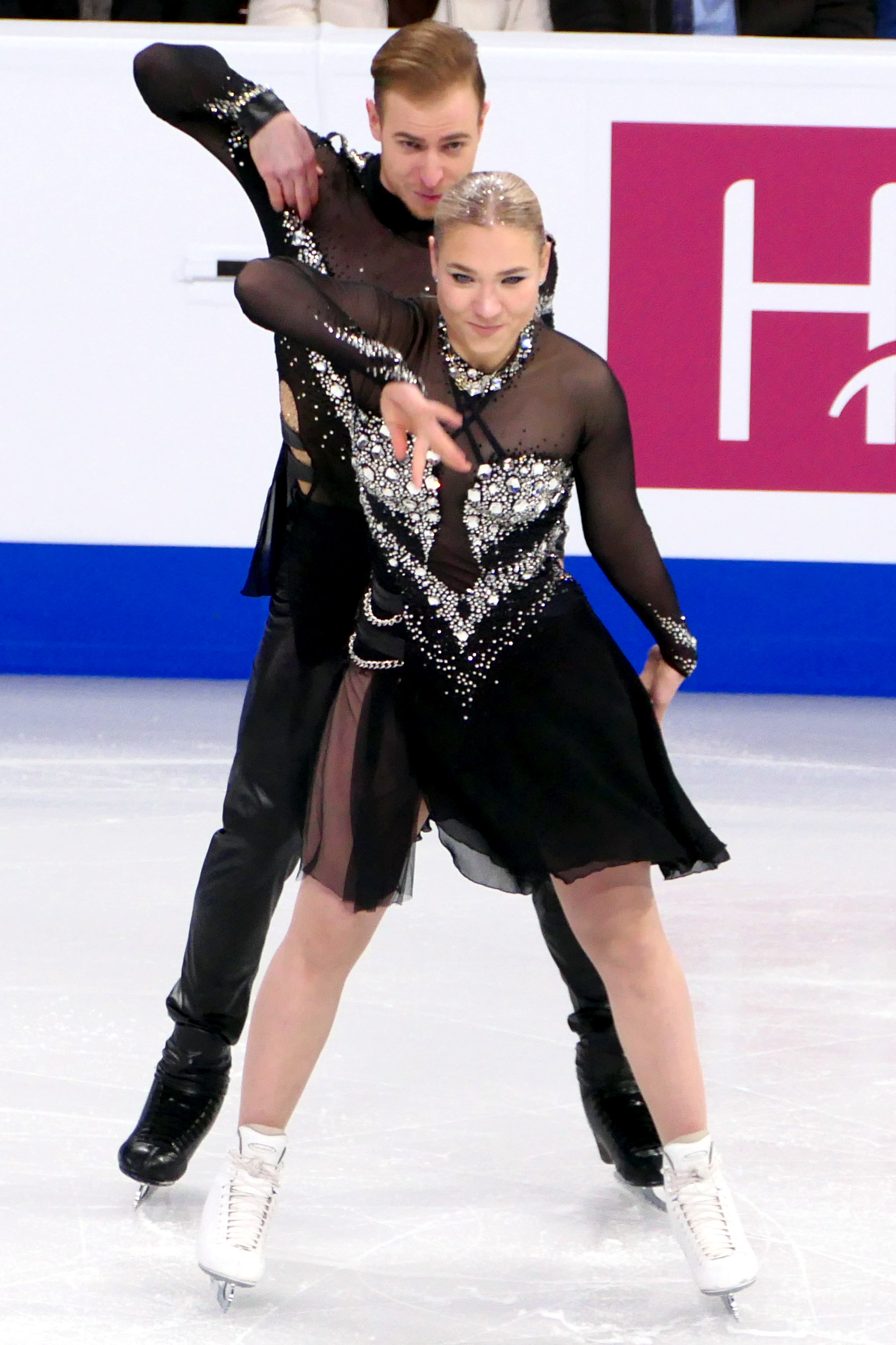
- Natálie Taschlerová and Filip Taschler at the 2024 World Championships

Personal information
- Born: 29 August 1999 (age 27) Brno, Czech Republic
- Height: 1.82 m (6 ft 0 in)

Figure skating career
- Country: Czech Republic
- Partner: Natálie Taschlerová
- Coach: Maurizio Margaglio; Neil Brown; Massimo Scali; Sini Parkkinen
- Skating club: VSK Technika Brno
- Began skating: 2004

Medal record
Czech Championships
Gold medal – first place	2022 Spišská Nová Ves	Ice dance
Gold medal – first place	2023 Budapest	Ice dance
Gold medal – first place	2025 Cieszyn	Ice dance
Silver medal – second place	2026 Presov	Ice dance

Filip Taschler (born 29 August 1999) is a Czech ice dancer. With his sister and skating partner, Natálie Taschlerová, he is a nine-time Challenger Series medalist (including three gold) and three-time Czech national champion (2022–23, 2025). They represented the Czech Republic at the 2022 and 2026 Winter Olympics.

On the junior level, he is a three-time Czech national junior champion (2018–20), the 2019 JGP USA bronze medalist, and has competed in the final segment at three World Junior Championships, their highest placement being fourteenth in 2019.

== Personal life ==
Taschler was born on 29 August 1999, in Brno, Czech Republic. His sister, Natálie, is two years younger than him. Taschler's father died in 2019.

In early 2026, he came out as bisexual.

== Career ==
=== Early career ===
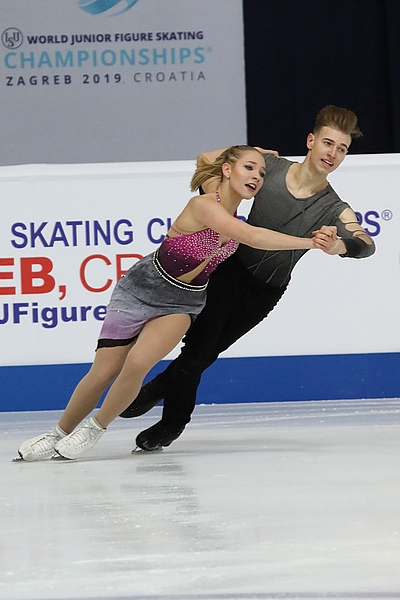
Taschlerová and Taschler at the 2018 World Junior Championships

Taschlerová began learning to skate in 2004 and subsequently began learning ice dance alongside her brother Filip following the end of his partnership with Karolína Karlíková. Years later, Taschler would say that "our relationship is better since we started skating together. When we were younger, we fought like small kids, but now we are adults. We respect each other."

Taschlerová/Taschler made their international junior debut in the 2017–18 season, including two appearances on the ISU Junior Grand Prix, placing twelfth in Poland and thirteenth in Austria. After winning what would be the first of three Czech junior national titles, they made their first appearance at the World Junior Championships, where they finished eighteenth.

Competing their second season on the Junior Grand Prix, Taschlerová/Taschler were thirteenth at JGP Lithuania and eleventh at their home JGP Czech Republic. They then won their first international junior medals competing at minor events, a bronze at the Open d'Andorra and a silver at the junior category at the Inge Solar Memorial. Junior national champions for the second time, they finished the season placing fourteenth at the 2019 World Junior Championships.

=== 2019–2020 season: JGP medal & senior debut ===
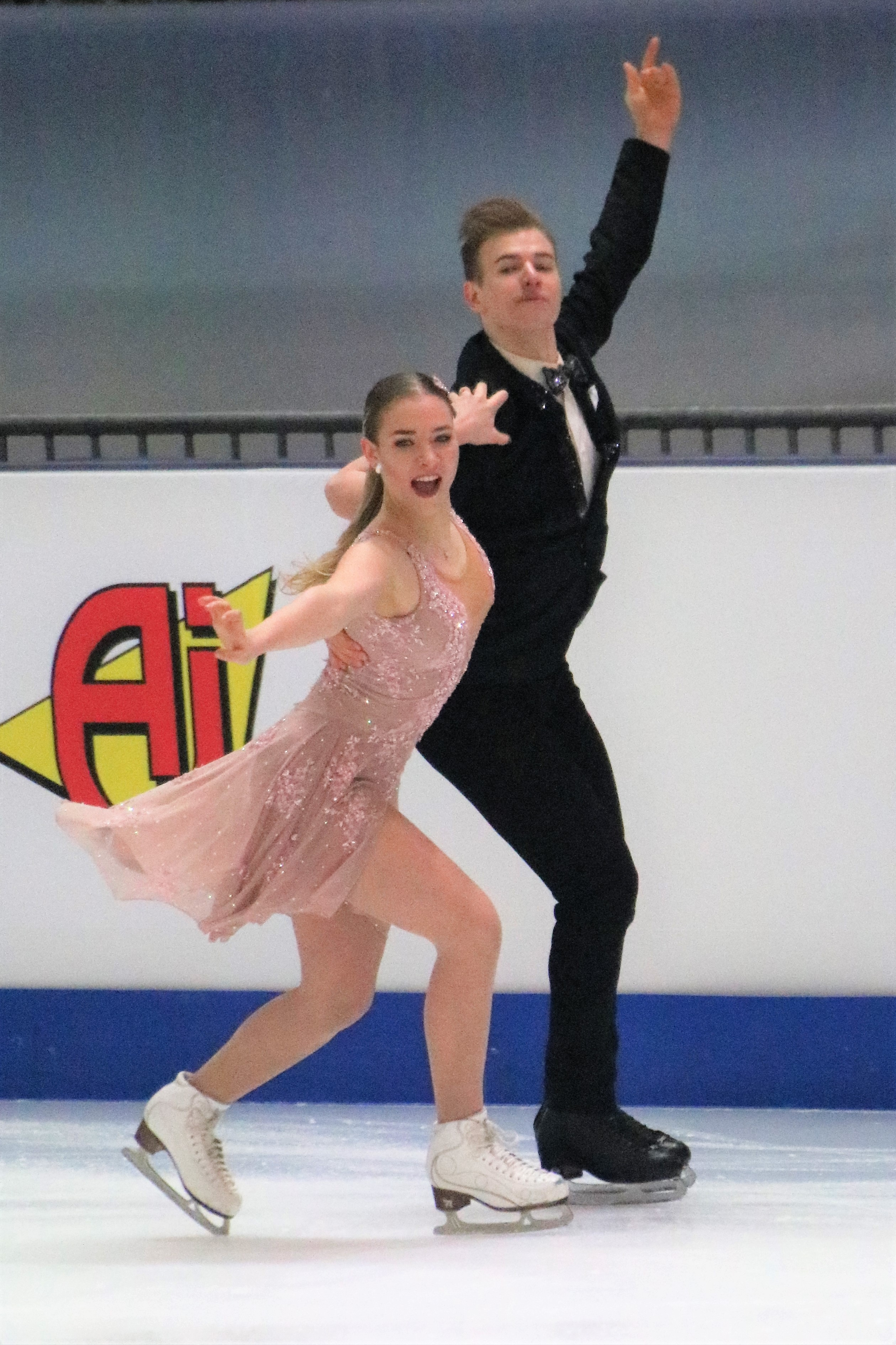
Taschlerová and Taschler at the European Figure Skating Championships

In the off-season, Taschlerová/Taschler began training part-time in the United States with Collin Brubaker and Oleg Epstein, in addition to longtime coach Matteo Zanni in Milan. They returned to the Junior Grand Prix, competing first at 2019 JGP United States in Lake Placid, New York. In a significant improvement over their previous two years, they came fourth in the rhythm dance. Then they overtook Canadians Makita/Gunara in the free dance for the bronze medal. They finished in fifth place at their second JGP in Croatia.

Following the Junior Grand Prix, Taschlerová/Taschler elected to make their international senior debut, winning the silver medal at the Open d'Andorra and thereby obtaining the technical minimum qualifications to attend their first European Figure Skating Championships, where they finished in nineteenth position. They participated in a third senior event, coming eighth at the Egna Trophy.

Winning the Czech junior title for the third time, they were again their country's entry to the World Junior Championships. Taschlerová fell out of her twizzle at the beginning of the rhythm dance, landing them in nineteenth place in that segment. They rose to sixteenth position following the free dance. Taschlerová/Taschler had been assigned to make their senior World Championship debut at the 2020 World Championships in Montreal, but these were cancelled due to the onset of the coronavirus pandemic.

=== 2020–2021 season: World Championships debut ===
Due to the pandemic, the siblings could not continue training in the United States under Epstein and Brubaker and entered the season with only Zanni as their coach. They began their first full senior season at the 2020 CS Nebelhorn Trophy, their first Challenger event, which due to the pandemic was attended only by European teams largely training in the area. Taschlerová/Taschler won the gold medal. They attended their second Egna Trophy, also winning gold there.

To conclude the season, Taschlerová/Taschler competed at the 2021 World Championships in Stockholm, where they placed twenty-second in the rhythm dance and did not advance to the free dance. As a result, they did not qualify a berth for the Czech Republic at the coming Winter Olympics on the first of two opportunities to do so.

=== 2021–2022 season: Beijing Olympics & First national title ===
Taschlerová/Taschler began the new season on the Challenger series, placing fifth with new personal bests at the 2021 CS Lombardia Trophy. In continued pursuit of an Olympic spot, they were next assigned as the Czech entry to the 2021 CS Nebelhorn Trophy, the second and final opportunity for dancers to qualify to the Olympic Games. They were second in the rhythm dance with another new personal best but dropped to fifth after the free dance due to a twizzle error, but their placement was sufficient to clinch the fourth of four available berths at the 2022 Winter Olympics. Afterward, their federation formally named them to the Czech Olympic team.

After winning the Pavel Roman Memorial and placing sixth at the 2021 CS Warsaw Cup, Taschlerová/Taschler won the Czech national title (finishing second overall at the 2022 Four National Championships). They were assigned to the 2022 European Championships in Tallinn and finished eleventh, qualifying for the free dance for the first time.

Taschlerová/Taschler began the 2022 Winter Olympics as the Czech entries in the rhythm dance segment of the Olympic team event. They placed sixth in the segment, securing five points for the Czech team. This was the highest Czech placement on day one of the event. Ultimately, the Czech team did not advance to the second stage of the competition and finished eighth overall. In the dance event, Taschlerová/Taschler placed seventeenth and qualified for the free dance. They moved up one place in the free dance, finishing sixteenth.

The team concluded the season at the 2022 World Championships, held in Montpellier with Russian dance teams absent due to the International Skating Union banning all Russian athletes due to their country's invasion of Ukraine. Taschlerová/Taschler finished thirteenth.

=== 2022–2023 season: Grand Prix debut ===
For the new season, Taschlerová and Taschler opted to perform a free dance based on the theme of climate change, a concept they had discussed since their junior career. Competing at two Challengers to begin, they won the bronze medal at the 2022 CS Lombardia Trophy before finishing fourth at the 2022 CS Finlandia Trophy. They were invited to make their senior Grand Prix debut, and came fifth at the 2022 MK John Wilson Trophy. They also finished fifth at their second assignment, the 2022 Grand Prix of Espoo, 5.40 points back of bronze medalists Turkkila/Versluis of Finland.

After winning the Czech national title and finishing first overall at the 2023 Four National Championships, Taschlerová/Taschler competed at the 2023 European Championships in Espoo. They finished fifth in the rhythm dance, qualifying to the final flight in the free dance by a margin of 0.42 over the French team Lopareva/Brissaud. They dropped behind the French in the free dance, finishing sixth overall. This was the highest placement for a Czech dance team at Europeans since Mrázová/Šimeček in 1995. Taschlerová/Taschler's result qualified a second berth for the Czech Republic at the following year's European championships, which was anticipated to be important given the rise of another Czech sibling team, Kateřina Mrázková and Daniel Mrázek, in the junior ranks that season. The siblings said afterward that "we definitely wanted to go for a medal. But overall, this experience of skating in the strongest group will strengthen us in the future." They hoped to finish in the top ten at the 2023 World Championships to earn a second berth there as well.

Ninth in the rhythm dance at the World Championships in Saitama, Taschlerová/Taschler moved up to eighth place after the free dance. This was the highest placement for a Czech team since Mrázová/Šimeček also finished eighth in 1994. The siblings cited their appreciation for the Japanese audience's love of figure skating, with Taschlerová adding that "we hope that we will have such an audience in Prague as well," as the 2026 edition was scheduled to be held in Prague.

=== 2023–2024 season ===
The siblings decided that their new free dance would be a tribute to their late father, after discarding their original plan for a Western theme in favour of something they considered "more internal and original." For the third consecutive year, they began the season at the Lombardia Trophy. Coming second in both segments, they won the silver medal. Weeks later they won a second Challenger medal, a bronze, at the 2023 CS Nepela Memorial.

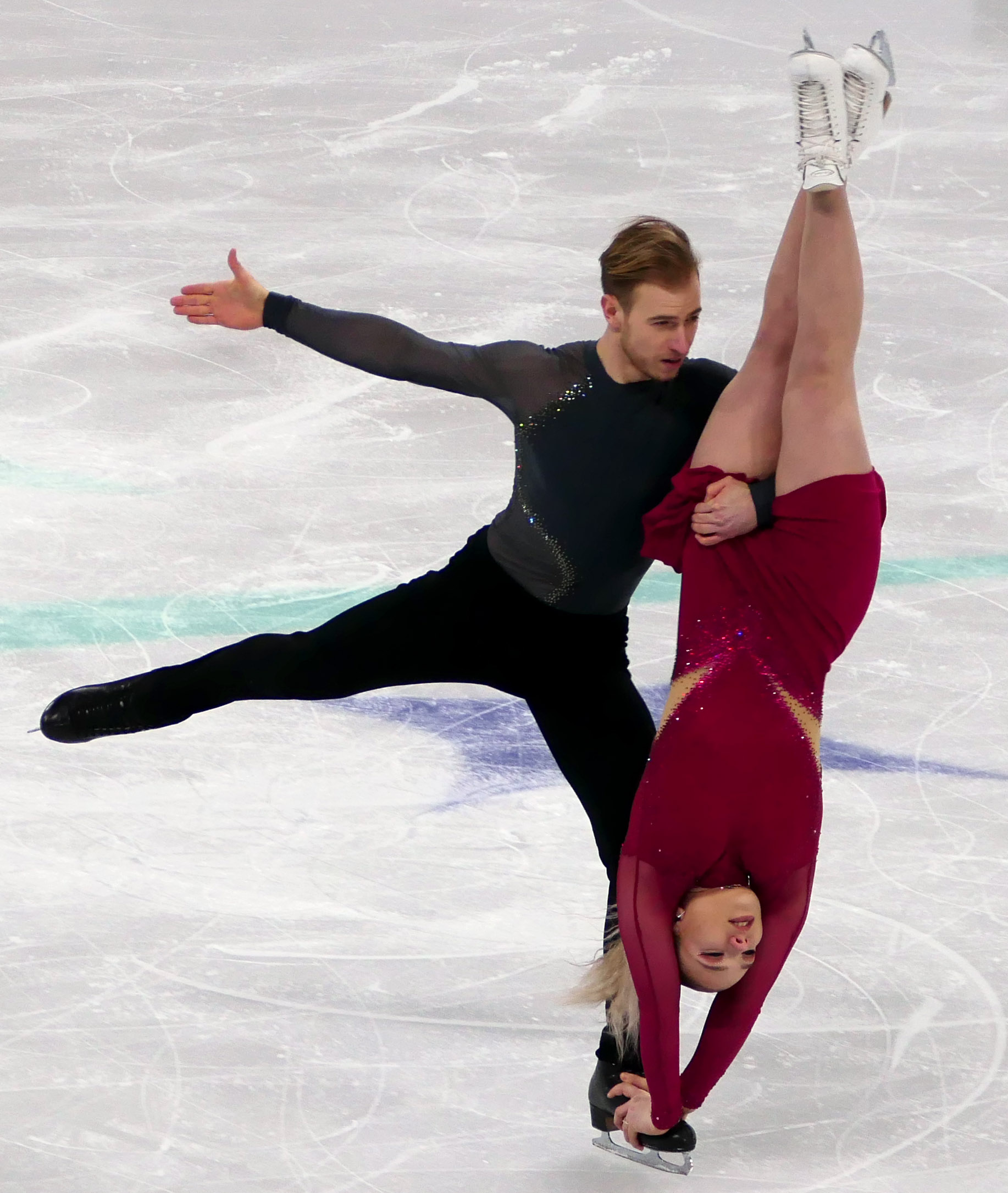
Taschlerová and Taschler performing a lift during their free dance at the 2024 World Championships

Taschlerová/Taschler's first Grand Prix assignment, the 2023 Skate America, was also the Grand Prix debut of fellow Czech sibling team Mrázková/Mrázek, which Taschlerová called "nice" as "we are great friends all together." This was the first time two Czech teams competed on the Grand Prix in the same year. They finished fourth in the rhythm dance, but dropped to fifth after the free dance, where their choreographic lift was invalidated. The duo were scheduled to compete at the 2023 Cup of China, but withdrew after what they had believed to be a minor injury to Taschler proved to be more serious. They issued a state saying: "We will do everything to be back on the ice as soon as possible, but of course health always comes first." It was subsequently revealed that Taschler had been suffering from a spinal fracture.

The siblings were able to resume training in early December, and participated in the 2024 European Championships, coming seventh. Taschler said they were "happy to be back." With their fellow sibling team placing ninth, it was the first time since 1980 that two Czech dance teams placed in the top ten.

At the 2024 World Championships, Taschlerová/Taschler encountered difficulties in the rhythm when she slipped on attempting to go up in their lift, and they failed to execute the element. As a result, they placed eighteenth in the segment, while Mrázková/Mrázek were thirteenth. He called it "a shock, we've never had a mistake like this before." They were fifteenth in the free dance, and rose to fifteenth overall, while their fellow Czechs remained thirteenth. Taschlerová said they were "satisfied with how the season was for us."

=== 2024–2025 season ===
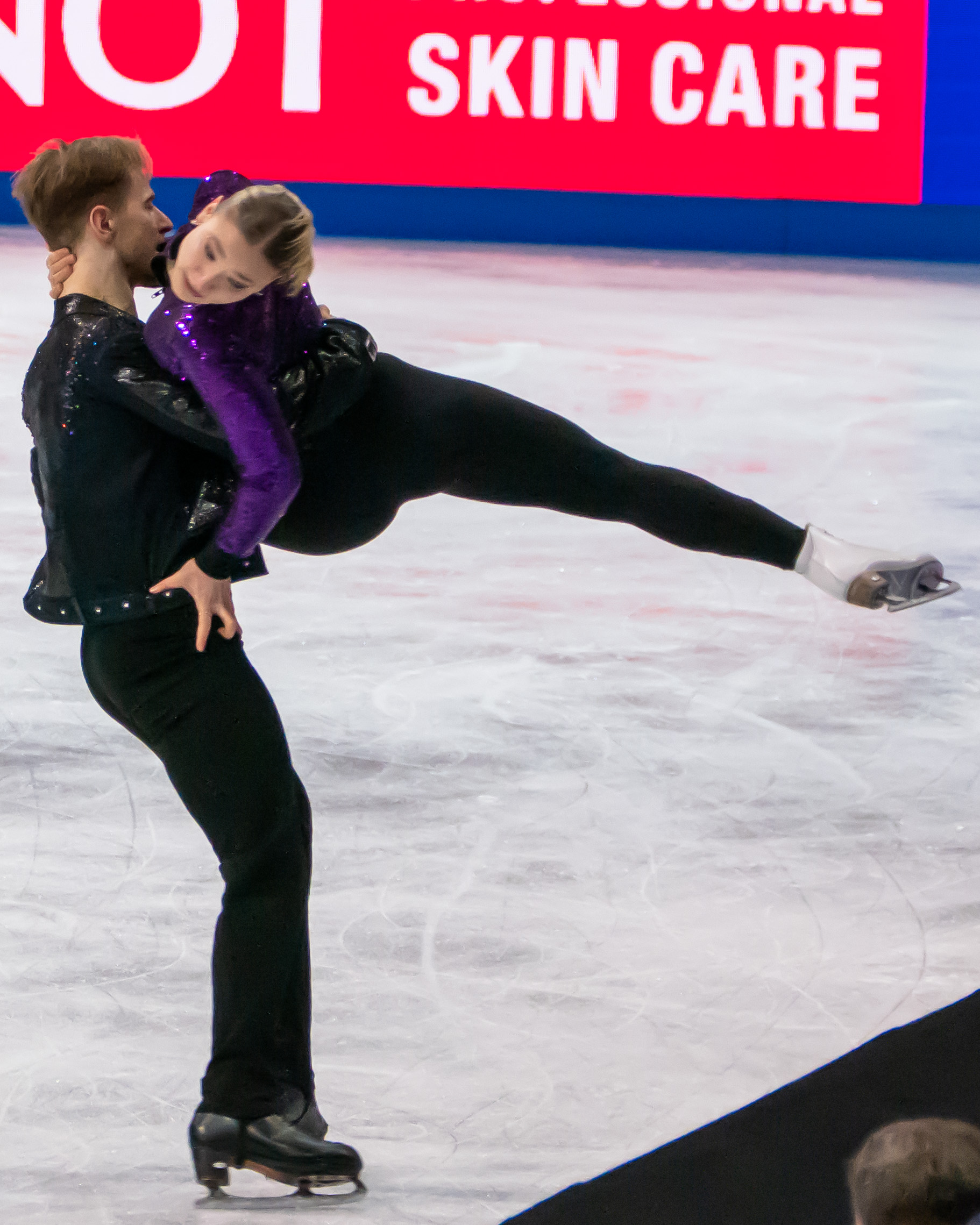
Taschlerová/Taschler performing their rhythm dance at the 2025 World Championships

Taschlerová/Taschler began their season by competing on the Challenger series, finishing fourth at the 2024 CS Nebelhorn Trophy and winning gold at the 2024 CS Denis Ten Memorial Challenge. Going on to compete on the 2024–25 Grand Prix circuit, the team finished fifth in the rhythm dance at the 2024 Skate Canada International, before moving up to fourth place in the free dance. Their second assignment was the 2024 Finlandia Trophy, where they also placed fourth, having come fourth in the rhythm dance and fifth in the free dance. Taschler remarked after the competition that he "had kind of a breakdown this morning and really didn’t want to skate today. But I am better now and glad I did it. Nati also helped a lot."

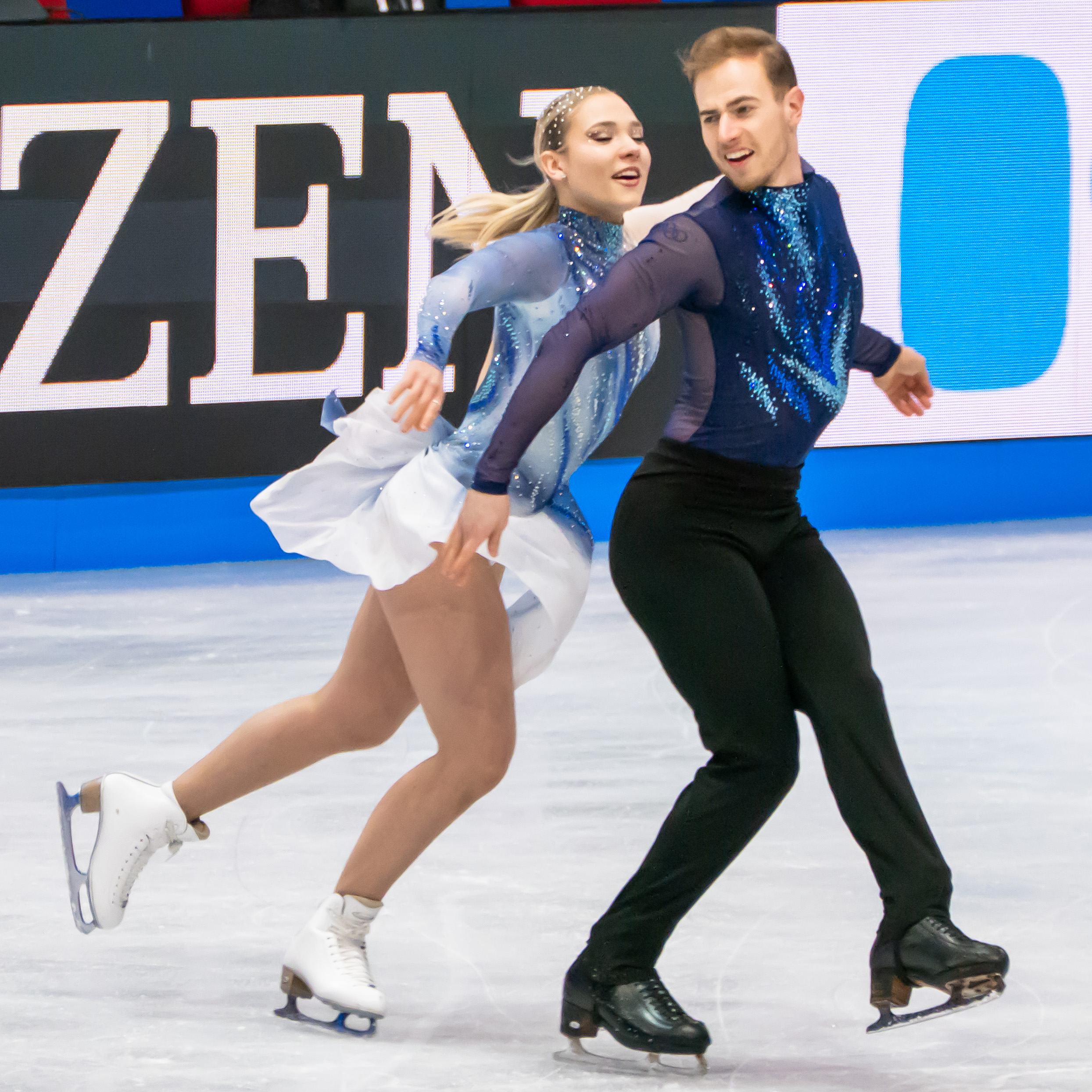
Taschlerová/Taschler performing their free dance at the 2025 World Championships

Concluding the first half of the season, Taschlerová/Taschler won another Czech national title. At the 2025 European Championships in Tallinn, Estonia, errors in the rhythm dance saw them come eleventh in the segment. She said that "a lot of small mistakes that cost us an estimated four to five points. We're sorry, we wanted a better start to the second half of the season." They rose to tenth place after the free dance, which Taschler observing that "after the rhythmic dance, today's program was a challenge, to believe in ourselves again, but we managed to do that."

At the 2025 World Championships in Boston, Massachusetts, United States, Taschlerová/Taschler came thirteenth in the segment after she struggled on her twizzles. They remained in thirteenth place after the free dance, which placement, combined with the twelfth-place finish of Mrázková/Mrázek, secured two berths for the Czech Republic at the 2026 Winter Olympics ice dance competition. This was the first time since the 1994 Winter Olympics that two Czech places were qualified.

In May, Taschlerová/Taschler announced that they were moving to train with coach Maurizio Margaglio in Helsinki, Finland. Taschler later alleged that Zanni had been controlling and mentally abusive and that their mental health had improved after moving to train with Margaglio.

=== 2025–2026 season: Milano Cortina Olympics ===
Taschlerová/Taschler opened their season by winning silver at the 2025 CS Nepela Memorial and gold at the 2025 Trophée Métropole Nice Côte d'Azur. They subsequently competed on the 2025–26 Grand Prix series, placing fourth at the 2025 NHK Trophy and eighth at the 2025 Finlandia Trophy. A week following the latter event, Taschlerová/Taschler won the bronze medal at the 2025 CS Tallinn Trophy.

In December, they won the silver medal at the 2026 Four National Championships. The following month, Taschlerová/Taschler finished tenth at the 2026 European Championships in Sheffield, England, United Kingdom. In February, they competed at the 2026 Winter Olympics, finishing 15th. They closed the season at the 2026 World Figure Skating Championships held on home soil, finishing 18th.

=== 2026–2027 season ===
The team opened their season by winning the bronze medal at the 2026 Kinoshita Group Cup. In October, they followed up with a silver medal at 2026 Budapest Trophy.

In November, the Taschlerová/Taschler competed at 2026 Cup of China, placing fourth overall. “I’m proud of how we ended this competition,” said Taschlerova. “We’re going to Helsinki, and then we have the Grand Prix Finland in two weeks. That’s our main focus.”

== Programs ==
=== With Taschlerová ===
Season	Rhythm dance	Free dance	Exhibition
2026–2027		Mundo Nuevo; Magnolias; Jeanne; Berghain by Rosalía	
2025–2026	Waiting for Tonight (Pablo's Miami Mix Radio Edit) (Spanglish) by Jennifer Lopez; Be with You; Rhythm Divine by Enrique Iglesias choreo. by Massimo Scali	The Matrix; Clubbed to Death; Chateau by Rob Dougan; Mona Lisa Overdrive by Juno Reactor; Navras by Juno Reactor & Don Davis; Matrix – Clubbed to Death (Epic Version) by Mathias Fritsche; Spybreak! by Propellerheads choreo. by Massimo Scali	Love in the Dark by Adele
2024–2025	Hot Stuff; I Feel Love by Donna Summer; No More Tears (Enough Is Enough) by Barbra Streisand & Donna Summer choreo. by Matteo Zanni, Pasquale Camerlengo	Porcelain; When It's Cold I'd Like to Die; In This World by Moby choreo. by Matteo Zanni, Pasquale Camerlengo	Love in the Dark by Adele; Feeling Good by Nina Simone; Hot Stuff; I Feel Love by Donna Summer; No More Tears (Enough Is Enough) by Barbra Streisand & Donna Summer choreo. by Matteo Zanni, Pasquale Camerlengo
2023–2024	The Knowledge by Janet Jackson, James Harris III, & Terry Lewis; Juicy Fruit by James Mtume; Serious Slammin' by The Pointer Sisters, Greg Crockett, & Lenan Zales choreo. by Matteo Zanni	Blucobalto by Negramaro; Terra Rosa by Balázs Havasi; Son felice by Giuliano Sangiorgi choreo. by Matteo Zanni	
2022–2023	Samba: Hips Don't Lie by Shakira; Rhumba: Hero by Enrique Iglesias; Samba: Hips Don't Lie by Shakira choreo. by Matteo Zanni	On the Nature of Daylight by Max Richter; Run by Ludovico Einaudi; Early Morning Fog by Jacob Shea and Jasha Klebe choreo. by Matteo Zanni	Music; Dance 2Night by Madonna arranged by Matteo Zanni; Give Me All Your Luvin' by M.I.A., Madonna, Nicki Minaj choreo. by Matteo Zanni
2021–2022	Music; Dance 2Night by Madonna arranged by Matteo Zanni; Give Me All Your Luvin' by M.I.A., Madonna, Nicki Minaj choreo. by Matteo Zanni	Yuyo Verde by Domingo Federico, Homero Expósito; Oblivion; Primavera Porteña by Astor Piazzolla choreo. by Matteo Zanni	
2020–2021	Swing: Walk Like a Man; Foxtrot: Can't Take My Eyes Off You; Swing: December 1963 (Oh, What a Night) (from Jersey Boys) by Bob Crewe, Bob Gaudio, Judy Parker choreo. by Matteo Zanni	Yuyo Verde by Domingo Federico, Homero Expósito; Oblivion; Primavera Porteña by Astor Piazzolla choreo. by Matteo Zanni	
2019–2020	Quickstep: Entr'act; Slow Fox: 'S Wonderful (from An American in Paris) by George Gershwin; Quickstep: You're Getting to Be a Habit with Me (from 42nd Street) by Al Dubin, Johnny Mercer and Harry Warren	Place de la Republique by Cœur de pirate; Sand by Nathan Lanier	
2018–2019	Tango: Tu Sentimiento performed by Tango Jointz; Flamenco: Consedor Flamenco; Street music: Ramalama (Bang Bang) by Róisín Murphy, Matthew Herbet	Believer by Imagine Dragons; Chasing Cars by Snow Patrol	
	Short dance		
2017–2018	Cha-cha: Cha Charanga by El Rubio Loco; Rhumba: Temptation performed by Tom Waits; Merengue: Bailar by Elvis Crespo, Deorro, Robert Fernández	Over the Rainbow by Harold Arlen, Yip Harburg; In This Shirt by The Irrepressibles	
2016–2017		Freedom (from Django Unchained) by Anthony Hamilton and Elayna Boynton; Lo chiamavano King by Luis Bacalov	

=== With Karlíková ===
Season	Free dance
2015–2016	Bonnie & Clyde by Frank Wildhorn; How 'Bout a Dance?; This World Will Remember Us

== Competitive highlights ==
=== Ice dance with Natálie Taschlerová ===
- GP – Event of the ISU Grand Prix Series
- JGP – Event of the ISU Junior Grand Prix Series
- CS – Event of the ISU Challenger Series
- C – Event was cancelled
- TBD – Assigned
- WD – Withdrew from competition

Competition placements at senior level
Season	2019–20	2020–21	2021–22	2022–23	2023–24	2024–25	2025–26	2026-27
Winter Olympics			16th				15th	
Winter Olympics (Team event)			8th					
World Championships	C	22nd	13th	8th	15th	13th	18th	
European Championships	19th		11th	6th	7th	10th	10th	
Czech Championships		WD	1st	1st		1st	2nd	
Four Nationals Championships			2nd	1st		1st	2nd	
GP Cup of China								4th
GP Finland				5th		4th	8th	TBD
GP NHK Trophy							4th	
GP Skate America					5th			
GP Skate Canada						4th		
GP Wilson Trophy				5th				
CS Budapest Trophy								1st
CS Denis Ten Memorial						1st		
CS Finlandia Trophy				4th				
CS Lombardia Trophy			5th	3rd	2nd			
CS Nebelhorn Trophy		1st	5th	WD		4th		
CS Nepela Memorial					3rd		2nd	
CS Tallinn Trophy							3rd	
CS Warsaw Cup		WD	6th					
CS Kinoshita Cup								3rd
CS Nepela Memorial								4th
Pavel Roman Memorial			1st					
Trophée Métropole Nice							1st	
Egna Spring Trophy	8th	1st		WD				
Open d'Andorra	2nd							

Competition placements at junior level
Season	2017–18	2018–19	2019–20
World Junior Championships	18th	14th	16th
Czech Championships	1st	1st	1st
JGP Austria	13th		
JGP Croatia			5th
JGP Czech Republic		11th	
JGP Lithuania		13th	
JGP Poland	12th		
JGP United States			3rd
Bavarian Open	4th	6th	
Halloween Cup			2nd
Inge Solar		2nd	
Leo Scheu	5th		
Open d'Andorra		3rd	
Pavel Roman Memorial		4th	
Santa Claus Cup	14th		

== Detailed results ==
=== Ice dance with Natálie Taschlerová ===
ISU personal best scores in the +5/-5 GOE System
Segment	Type	Score	Event
Total	TSS	196.39	2023 World Championships
Short program	TSS	77.35	2025 CS Tallinn Trophy
Short program	TES	44.63	2025 CS Tallinn Trophy
Short program	PCS	33.35	2026 European Championships
Free skating	TSS	119.83	2023 World Championships
Free skating	TES	68.13	2023 World Championships
Free skating	PCS	51.70	2023 World Championships

==== Senior results ====
Results in the 2019–20 season
Date	Event	RD		FD		Total	
Date	Event	P	Score	P	Score	P	Score
20–24 Nov 2019	2019 Open d'Andorra	2	63.80	2	101.89	2	165.69
20–26 Jan 2020	(Austria) 2020 European Championships	17	62.53	18	91.77	19	154.30
7–9 Sep 2020	(Italy) 2020 Egna Dance Trophy	6	61.71	9	85.39	8	147.10

Results in the 2020–21 season
Date	Event	RD		FD		Total	
Date	Event	P	Score	P	Score	P	Score
23–26 Sep 2020	(Germany) 2020 CS Nebelhorn Trophy	1	64.28	1	99.34	1	163.62
6–7 Feb 2021	(Italy) 2021 Egna Dance Trophy	1	72.11	1	106.37	1	178.48
22–28 Mar 2021	(Sweden) 2021 World Championships	22	64.00	-	-	22	64.00

Results in the 2021–22 season
Date	Event	RD		FD		Total	
Date	Event	P	Score	P	Score	P	Score
10–12 Sep 2021	(Italy) 2021 CS Lombardia Trophy	5	68.45	4	104.29	5	172.74
22–25 Sep 2021	(Germany) 2021 CS Nebelhorn Trophy	2	70.51	5	102.47	5	172.98
4–7 Nov 2021	(Czech Republic) 2021 Pavel Roman Memorial	1	71.91	1	108.95	1	180.86
17–20 Nov 2021	(Poland) 2021 CS Warsaw Cup	5	73.22	8	102.26	6	175.48
17–18 Dec 2021	(Slovakia) 2022 Four National Championships	2	73.27	1	106.68	2	181.09
17–18 Dec 2021	(Czech Republic) 2022 Czech Championships (Note: The Czech Championships are contested as part of the Four Nationals Championships.)	1	—N/a	1	—N/a	1	—N/a
10–16 Jan 2022	(Estonia) 2022 European Championships	11	69.72	13	102.67	11 (yes)	172.39
4–7 Feb 2022	(China) 2022 Winter Olympics (Team event)	6	68.99	–	–	8	–
12–14 Feb 2022	(China) 2022 Winter Olympics	17	67.22	17	101.10	16	168.32
21–27 Mar 2022	(France) 2022 World Championships	11	72.55	14	99.68	13	172.23

Results in the 2022–23 season
Date	Event	RD		FD		Total	
Date	Event	P	Score	P	Score	P	Score
16–19 Sep 2022	(Italy) 2022 CS Lombardia Trophy	2	75.41	3	108.14	3	183.55
4–9 Oct 2022	(Finland) 2022 CS Finlandia Trophy	4	72.79	4	106.06	4	178.85
11–13 Nov 2022	(United Kingdom) 2022 MK John Wilson Trophy	5	74.09	6	103.80	5	177.89
25–27 Nov 2022	(Finland) 2022 Grand Prix of Espoo	5	74.60	5	111.79	5	186.39
15–17 Dec 2022	(Hungary) 2023 Four National Championships	1	77.92	1	114.84	1	192.76
15–17 Dec 2022	(Czech Republic) 2023 Czech Championships	1	—N/a	1	—N/a	1	—N/a
25–29 Jan 2023	(Finland) 2023 European Championships	5	76.91	6	111.43	6	188.34
22–26 Mar 2023	(Japan) 2023 World Championships	9	76.56	8	119.83	8	196.39

Results in the 2023–24 season
Date	Event	RD		FD		Total	
Date	Event	P	Score	P	Score	P	Score
8–10 Sep 2023	(Italy) 2023 CS Lombardia Trophy	2	75.21	2	114.02	2	189.23
28–30 Sep 2023	(Slovakia) 2023 CS Nepela Memorial	4	74.34	2	113.00	3	187.34
20–22 Oct 2023	(United States) 2023 Skate America	4	75.21	5	109.63	5	184.84
8–14 Jan 2024	(Lithuania) 2024 European Championships	5	76.68	7	114.87	7	191.55
18–24 Mar 2024	(Canada) 2024 World Championships	18	68.25	15	111.92	15	180.17

Results in the 2024–25 season
Date	Event	RD		FD		Total	
Date	Event	P	Score	P	Score	P	Score
19–21 Sep 2024	(Germany) 2024 CS Nebelhorn Trophy	4	75.10	4	107.05	4	182.15
3–5 Oct 2024	(Kazakhstan) 2024 CS Denis Ten Memorial Challenge	2	73.03	1	116.20	1	189.23
25–27 Oct 2024	2024 Skate Canada International	6	74.97	4	114.63	4	189.60
15–17 Nov 2024	(Finland) 2024 Finlandia Trophy	4	75.50	5	114.93	4	190.43
13–14 Dec 2024	(Poland) 2025 Four Nationals Championships	1	78.93	1	116.26	1	195.19
13–14 Dec 2024	(Czech Republic) 2025 Czech Championships	1	—N/a	1	—N/a	1	—N/a
28 Jan – 2 Feb 2025	(Estonia) 2025 European Championships	11	73.44	8	115.05	10	188.49
25–30 Mar 2025	(United States) 2025 World Championships	13	73.29	13	112.37	13	185.66

Results in the 2025–26 season
Date	Event	RD		FD		Total	
Date	Event	P	Score	P	Score	P	Score
25–27 Sep 2025	(Slovakia) 2025 CS Nepela Memorial	1	76.55	5	110.05	2	186.60
1–5 Oct 2025	(France) 2025 Trophée Métropole Nice Côte d'Azur	1	76.22	1	110.16	1	186.38
7–9 Nov 2025	(Japan) 2025 NHK Trophy	4	74.70	6	108.63	4	183.33
21–23 Nov 2025	(Finland) 2025 Finlandia Trophy	6	71.65	10	101.30	8	172.95
25–30 Nov 2025	(Estonia) 2025 CS Tallinn Trophy	1	77.35	3	113.65	3	191.00
11–13 Dec 2025	(Slovakia) 2026 Four Nationals Championships	2	74.91	2	111.12	2	186.03
11–13 Dec 2025	(Czech Republic) 2026 Czech Championships	2	—N/a	2	—N/a	2	—N/a
13–18 Jan 2026	(United Kingdom) 2026 European Championships	9	77.33	10	112.14	10	189.47
9–11 Feb 2026	(Italy) 2026 Winter Olympics	14	75.33	15	109.67	15	185.00
24–29 Mar 2026	(Czech Republic) 2026 World Championships	14	76.35	19	97.58	18	173.93

Results in the 2026–27 season
Date	Event	RD		FD		Total	
Date	Event	P	Score	P	Score	P	Score
4–6 Sept 2026	(Japan) 2026 Kinoshita Group Cup	3	73.79	4	103.04	3	176.83
24–27 Sept 2026	(Slovakia) 2026 Nepela Memorial	4	74.20	5	106.74	4	180.94
15–18 Oct 2026	(Hungary) 2026 CS Budapest Trophy	2	76.25	1	109.41	1	185.66
Nov 6–8, 2026	2026 Cup of China	3	73.10	5	105.11	4	178.21

==== Junior results ====
2019–2020 season
Date	Event	RD	FD	Total
2–8 March 2020	2020 World Junior Championships	19; 52.80	16; 81.78	16; 134.58
14–15 December 2019	2020 Four National Championships	1; 60.89	1; 94.72	1; 155.61
17–20 October 2019	2019 Halloween Cup	3; 54.61	1; 92.17	2; 146.78
Septembers 25–28, 2019	2019 JGP Croatia	6; 57.94	6; 88.36	5; 146.30
28–31 August 2019	2019 JGP United States	4; 60.69	3; 89.31	3; 150.00
2018–2019 season
Date	Event	RD	FD	Total
4–10 March 2019	2019 World Junior Championships	16; 51.02	14; 80.89	14; 131.91
5–10 February 2019	2019 Bavarian Open	7; 51.70	6; 80.43	6; 132.13
14–15 December 2018	2019 Four National Championships	1; 54.07	1; 84.12	1; 138.19
29 Nov – 2 December 2018	2018 Open d'Andorra	3; 51.87	2; 80.42	3; 132.29
12–18 November 2018	2018 Inge Solar Alpen Trophy	5; 45.80	2; 78.54	2; 124.34
9–11 November 2018	2018 Pavel Roman Memorial	6; 51.28	3; 80.66	4; 131.94
26–29 September 2018	2018 JGP Czech Republic (Czech Skate)	12; 49.18	12; 76.30	11; 125.48
5–8 September 2018	2018 JGP Lithuania (Amber Cup)	10; 46.62	15; 60.13	13; 106.75
2017–2018 season
Date	Event	SD	FD	Total
5–11 March 2018	2018 World Junior Championships	16; 50.25	18; 60.05	18; 110.30
26–31 January 2018	2018 Bavarian Open	3; 47.40	4; 65.97	4; 113.37
14–17 December 2017	2018 Four National Championships	2; 47.03	2; 62.11	2; 109.14
4–10 December 2017	2017 Santa Claus Cup	9; 45.06	17; 54.55	14; 99.61
8–12 November 2017	2017 Leo Scheu Memorial (Ice Challenge)	5; 37.96	4; 62.16	5; 100.12
4–7 October 2017	2017 JGP Poland (Baltic Cup)	11; 46.05	13; 59.28	12; 105.33
30 Aug – 2 September 2017	2017 JGP Austria	14; 36.30	11; 53.19	13; 89.49
