= Max Styler =

American DJ and record producer

- Born: San Luis Obispo, California
- Occupations: DJ and record producer
- Years active: 2012–present
- Labels: Nu Moda; Experts Only; Diynamic Music; Three Six Zero; Armada; Black Book Records; Insomniac Records; REALM; Spinnin’ Deep; Repopulate Mars; Dim Mak
- Website: www.maxstyler.com

Max Styler is an American DJ and record producer with many EPs and tracks in sub-genres including tech house and indie dance. His music has been released on Solomun’s Diynamic label as well as on Experts Only, Three Six Zero, Black Book, Insomniac, Realm, Armada, Dim Mak, and, beginning in 2025, his own Nu Moda label. He's known for a consistently large body of work and for mixing and mastering all his music.

== Early life and education ==
Styler (born January 12, 1996) grew up in San Luis Obispo, California. He began producing in 2012 when he was 16, teaching himself production.

== Career ==
=== Dim Mak signing ===
Styler began to gain recognition when Johnny Kenny of Collective Efforts took notice of the tracks the teenager was sending in and became his manager. In 2014, at 18 years old, Styler signed to Steve Aoki’s Dim Mak label, where he released tracks including 2017's "Knock Me Down," a collaboration with Makj featuring Elayna Boynton, "Heroes" feat. Nevve, several EPs, and "Shakalaka," a collaboration with Aoki, Deorro, and Make. The support he received from Dim Mak at this early stage of his career prompted him to have the label's logo tattooed on his arm. In 2017 he toured China with Steve Aoki

In 2019 his single "Let Me Take You There" (feat. Laura White) hit No. 1 on Sirius XM’s Diplo’s Revolution.

=== 2022–2025 ===
"Resist," Styler's first release on Experts Only (formerly Off The Grid Records), came out in 2022. His 2023 releases included the EPs Wanna Dance on Experts Only and Destination on Repopulate Mars, and the singles "Hypnotic" (on Realm Records), a Top 10 Club track on Beatport, and "Rhythm Machine" (on Insomniac Records) with Westend.

In 2024, having signed with Metatone Management, Styler had six #1 tracks on Beatport and finished the year as Beatport's No. 7 highest-selling artist and the No. 4 highest-selling Tech house artist worldwide. He was named Dancing Astronaut’s Breakout Artist of the year. His 2024 tour schedule included Burning Man, EDC Las Vegas, Day Trip Festival in Los Angeles and more than 50 other dates, up from about 28 appearances in 2023.

In 2025 his concert schedule grew to almost 100 dates.

In 2025, Styler was the No. 2 best-selling artist on Beatport for the first half of the year and finished 2025 as Beatport's No. 1 top-selling artist in Indie Dance, and No. 2 in Tech house. EDM.com named him a "Class of 2025" producer, and his 40-date summer tour included festival sets at EDC Las Vegas, Bonnaroo, Tomorrowland, and Creamfields, with appearances in North and South America, Europe, and the UAE.

=== 2025–present and Nu Moda label launch ===
Styler launched his record label, Nu Moda, in 2025. Its first release was his single “You & Me” on October 17, 2025. The track hit No. 1 on Beatport's Indie Dance chart. It was followed by "One More" (feat. Ad-Apt), which was quickly remixed by DJ Solomun, and "Oldskool Flavor" (feat. Greggio). Styler described his vision for Nu Moda as an event organizer and lifestyle brand as well as a music label, "committed to unearthing new sounds, talent, and intersections with culture." In 2025 and 2026 Nu Moda also released music from Solomun, Vintage Culture, Notre Dame, WELKER, kryptogram, Ugo Banchi, Josh Gigante, Greggio, Mishell, Andrew Meller, and more.

Also in October 2025, 1001Tracklists named Styler the top music producer on its “Top 101 Producers of 2025” list, a ranking based on the number of tracks "played by DJs in verified live sets, radio shows and mixes."

Styler was on the 2026 Coachella roster, one stop on a 26-date international tour that also includes Miami Music Week, Radius Chicago, Mission Ballroom in Denver, History Toronto, The Brooklyn Storehouse, KOKO London, the Concourse Project Austin, Club Space Miami, two nights at The Regency Ballroom in San Francisco, as well as Rock in Rio, Lollapalooza, Tomorrowland, Project Glow, EDC Mexico, Só Track Boa Brasil, and many more.

== Selected discography ==
=== EPs ===
List of extended plays, with selected details
Title	Details	Ref.
I Don't Think I Can Stop	Released: 7 August 2026; Max Styler; Label: Nu Moda; Format: Digital download, streaming	
Every Night	Released: 29 August 2025; Max Styler, Deomid; Label: Diynamic Music; Format: Digital download, streaming	
Need You Tonight	Released: 16 May 2025; Max Styler; Label: Trick; Format: Digital download, streaming	
Let 'Em Know	Released: 31 January 2025; Max Styler; Label: Diynamic Music; Format: Digital download, streaming	
Addiction	Released: 6 September 2024; Max Styler, Oscar L; Label: Truesoul; Format: Digital download, streaming	
Wanna Dance	Released: 27 January 2023; Max Styler; Label: Experts Only; Format: Digital download, streaming	
Destination	Released: 2023; Max Styler; Label: Repopulate Mars; Format: Digital download, streaming	
Supernatural	Released: 2019; Max Styler; Label: Dim Mak; Format: Digital download, streaming	
Aftershock	Released: 2015; Max Styler; Label: Dim Mak; Format: Digital download, streaming	

=== Singles and remixes ===
List of singles and remixes, with selected details
Title	Details	Ref.
"Oldskool Flavor"	Released: 22 May 2026; Max Styler, Greggio; Label: Nu Moda; Format: Digital download, streaming	
"Freaky 1"	Released: 10 April 2026; Max Styler, Vintage Culture, Ali Love; Label: Format: Digital download, streaming	
"One More Feat. Ad-Apt (Solomun Remix)"	Released: 20 March 2026; Max Styler, Ad-Apt; Label: Nu Moda; Format: Digital download, streaming	
"One More Feat. Ad-Apt"	Released: 13 February 2026; Max Styler, Ad-Apt; Label: Nu Moda; Format: Digital download, streaming	
"You & Me (Notre Dame Remix)"	Released: 23 January 2026; Max Styler; Label: Nu Moda; Format: Digital download, streaming	
"Greece 2000 (Max Styler Rework)"	Released: 9 January 2026; Max Styler; Label: Format: Digital download, streaming	
"You & Me (Vintage Culture Remix)"	Released: 12 December 2025; Max Styler; Label: Format: Digital download, streaming	
"You & Me"	Released: 17 October 2025; Max Styler; Label: Format: Digital download, streaming	
"Get Down"	Released: 29 August 2025; Max Styler; Label: Format: Digital download, streaming	
"Backtrack Blow Up (Max Styler Remix)"	Released: 25 July 2025; Samantha Loveridge; Label: Format: Digital download, streaming	
"London's on Fire"	Released: 4 July 2025; Chris Lorenzo, Max Styler, Audio Bullys; Label: Format: Digital download, streaming	
"Blessings (Max Styler Remix)"	Released: 20 June 2025; Calvin Harris, Clementine Douglas; Label: Format: Digital download, streaming	
"Let Go"	Released: 16 May 2025; Max Styler, Ose; Label: Format: Digital download, streaming	
"I Know You Want To"	Released: 14 March 2025; Max Styler; Label: Format: Digital download, streaming	
"Don't Stop"	Released: 31 January 2025; Max Styler; Label: Format: Digital download, streaming	
"Inferno"	Released: 31 January 2025; Max Styler; Label: Format: Digital download, streaming	
"On Repeat"	Released: 13 December 2024; Max Styler, Club De Combat; Label: Format: Digital download, streaming	
"Time to Go"	Released: 8 November 2024; Max Styler; Label: Format: Digital download, streaming	
"Touch"	Released: 11 October 2024; Max Styler, Gorgon City; Label: Format: Digital download, streaming	
"Tears (with Paige Cavell) [Max Styler Remix]"	Released: 20 September 2024; John Summit, Paige Cavell; Label: Format: Digital download, streaming	
"Yapper"	Released: 6 September 2024; Max Styler, Oscar L; Label: Format: Digital download, streaming	
"See You Sweat"	Released: 12 July 2024; Max Styler, GENESI (ITA); Label: Format: Digital download, streaming	
"Follow Me"	Released: 24 May 2024; Max Styler; Label: Format: Digital download, streaming	
"Rhythm Machine"	Released: 15 May 2024; Westend, Max Styler; Label: Format: Digital download, streaming	
"Lights Out"	Released: 3 May 2024; Max Styler; Label: Format: Digital download, streaming	
"Kiki"	Released: 29 March 2024; Max Styler; Label: Format: Digital download, streaming	
"Mesmerized (Max Styler Remix)"	Released: 8 March 2024; Gene Farris; Label: Format: Digital download, streaming	
"Hypnotic"	Released: 17 November 2023; Max Styler; Label: Format: Digital download, streaming	
"Satisfy"	Released: 13 October 2023; Max Styler; Label: Format: Digital download, streaming	
"Speaker Freaker"	Released: 22 September 2023; Max Styler; Label: Format: Digital download, streaming	
"Amazing"	Released: 18 August 2023; Max Styler, Shayee; Label: Format: Digital download, streaming	
"Lose Your Mind"	Released: 23 June 2023; Max Styler, Jem Cooke; Label: Format: Digital download, streaming	
"Destination"	Released: 14 April 2023; Max Styler; Label: Format: Digital download, streaming	
"Pressure"	Released: 14 April 2023; Max Styler, Haylee Wood; Label: Format: Digital download, streaming	
"Love Like This (Max Styler Remix)"	Released: 31 March 2023; Leftwing : Kody, Robot Collective; Label: Format: Digital download, streaming	
"Rock the House"	Released: 27 January 2023; Max Styler, FRANCO BA; Label: Format: Digital download, streaming	
"Talk to Me (With BRUX)"	Released: 11 November 2022; Max Styler, Anthony Attala, BRUX; Label: Format: Digital download, streaming	
"Move My Feet"	Released: 14 October 2022; Max Styler, Notelle; Label: Format: Digital download, streaming	
"Resist"	Released: 2 September 2022; Max Styler; Label: Format: Digital download, streaming	
