= 2026 CS Budapest Trophy =

Figure skating competition

- Type: ISU Challenger Series
- Date: 15 – 18 October 2026
- Season: 2026–27
- Location: Budapest, Hungary
- Host: Hungarian National Skating Federation
- Venue: Vasas Jégcentrum

Champions
- Men's singles: (Italy) Daniel Grassl
- Women's singles: (Individual Neutral Athletes) Alina Gorbacheva
- Ice dance: (Czech Republic) Natálie Taschlerová and Filip Taschler
- Previous: 2024 CS Budapest Trophy
- Next: 2027 CS Budapest Trophy
- Previous CS: 2026 CS Denis Ten Memorial Challenge
- Next CS: 2026 CS Tallinn Trophy

The 2026 Budapest Trophy is a figure skating competition sanctioned by the International Skating Union (ISU), organized and hosted by the Hungarian National Skating Federation, and the ninth event of the 2026–27 ISU Challenger Series. It was held at the Vasas Jégcentrum in Budapest, Hungary, from 15 to 18 October 2026. Medals were awarded in men's singles, women's singles, and ice dance, and skaters earned ISU World Standing points based on their results. Daniel Grassl of Italy won the men's event, Alina Gorbacheva of Russia, competing as an Individual Neutral Athlete, won the women's event, and Natálie Taschlerová and Filip Taschler of the Czech Republic won the ice dance event.

== Background ==
The Budapest Trophy was first held in 2020 as part of the 2020–21 Challenger Series that was ultimately reduced to two events due to the COVID-19 pandemic. The Budapest Trophy has been held every year since, although the 2021 and 2025 editions were not part of the Challenger Series.

The ISU Challenger Series was introduced in 2014. It is a series of international figure skating competitions sanctioned by the International Skating Union (ISU) and organized by ISU member nations. The objective was to ensure consistent organization and structure within a series of international competitions linked together, providing opportunities for senior-level skaters to compete at the international level and also earn ISU World Standing points. The 2026–27 Challenger Series consisted of thirteen events, of which the Budapest Trophy was the ninth.

== Changes in preliminary assignments ==
The International Skating Union published the preliminary list of entrants on 7 October 2026.

=== Changes to preliminary assignments ===
| Date | Discipline | Withdrew | Added | Ref. |
|---|---|---|---|---|
| 12 October | Men | (Individual Neutral Athletes); Grigory Fedorov | —N/a | |
| 12 October | Men | (Mexico); Donovan Carrillo | —N/a | |
| 12 October | Men | (Spain); Andre Zapata | —N/a | |
| 12 October | Women | (Individual Neutral Athletes); Maria Zakharova | —N/a | |
| 12 October | Women | (Finland); Selma Valitalo | —N/a | |
| 12 October | Women | (Ukraine); Sofiia Ekzarkhova | —N/a | |
| 13 October | Women | (Mexico); Andrea Montesinos Cantu | —N/a | |
| 15 October | Ice dance | (Hungary); Mariia Ignateva; Danijil Szemko | —N/a | |

== Required performance elements ==
=== Single skating ===
Men and women competing in single skating first perform their short programs. The men will do it on 16 October and the women on 17 October. Lasting no more than 2 minutes 40 seconds, the short program has to include the following elements:

For men: one double or triple Axel; one triple or quadruple jump; one jump combination consisting of a double jump and a triple jump, two triple jumps, or a quadruple jump and a double jump or triple jump; one flying spin; one camel spin or sit spin with a change of foot; one spin combination with a change of foot; and one step sequence using the full ice surface.

For women: one double or triple Axel; one triple jump; one jump combination consisting of a double jump and a triple jump, or two triple jumps; one flying spin; one layback spin, sideways leaning spin, camel spin, or sit spin without a change of foot; one spin combination with a change of foot; and one step sequence using the full ice surface.

Men and women then perform their free skates on 18 October. The free skate can last no more than 4 minutes, and has to include the following: six jump elements, of which one has to be an Axel-type jump; three spins, of which one has to be a spin combination, one a flying spin, and one a choreographic spin; one step sequence; and a choreographic sequence.

=== Ice dance ===
Couples competing in ice dance first perform their rhythm dances on 16 October. Lasting no more than 2 minutes 50 seconds, the theme of the rhythm dance this season is "Rhythm and Waltz". The rhythm dance has to include the following elements: one section of the Golden Waltz pattern dance, one creative dance element, one dance lift, one set of sequential twizzles, and one step sequence while not touching.

Couples then perform their free dances on 18 October. The free dance can last no longer than 4 minutes, and has to include the following: three dance lifts or one short lift and one combination lift; one dance spin; one step sequence in hold; one set of synchronized twizzles, one one-foot turns sequence in hold, and two choreographic elements.

== Judging ==
Skaters are judged according to the required technical elements of their program (such as jumps and spins), as well as the overall presentation of their program, based on three program components (skating skills, presentation, and composition). Each technical element in a figure skating performance is assigned a predetermined base point value and scored by a panel of nine judges on a scale from −5 to +5 based on the quality of its execution. Each Grade of Execution (GOE) from –5 to +5 is assigned a value as indicated on the Scale of Values. For example, a triple Axel is worth a base value of 8.00 points, and a GOE of +3 is worth 2.40 points, so a triple Axel with a GOE of +3 earns 10.40 points. The judging panel's GOE for each element is determined by calculating the trimmed mean (the average after discarding the highest and lowest scores). The panel's scores for all elements are added together to generate a Total Elements Score. At the same time, the judges evaluate each performance based on the five aforementioned program components and assign each a score from 0.25 to 10 in 0.25-point increments. The judging panel's final score for each program component is also determined by calculating the trimmed mean. Those scores are then multiplied by the factor shown on the chart below; the results are added together to generate a total Program Component Score.

Program component factoring
| Discipline | Short program or rhythm dance | Free skate or free dance |
|---|---|---|
| Men | 1.67 | 3.33 |
| Women | 1.33 | 2.67 |
| Ice dance | 1.33 | 2.00 |

Deductions are applied for certain violations, such as time infractions, stops and restarts, or falls. The Total Elements Score and Program Component Score are then added together, minus any deductions, to generate a final performance score for each skater or team.

== Medal summary ==
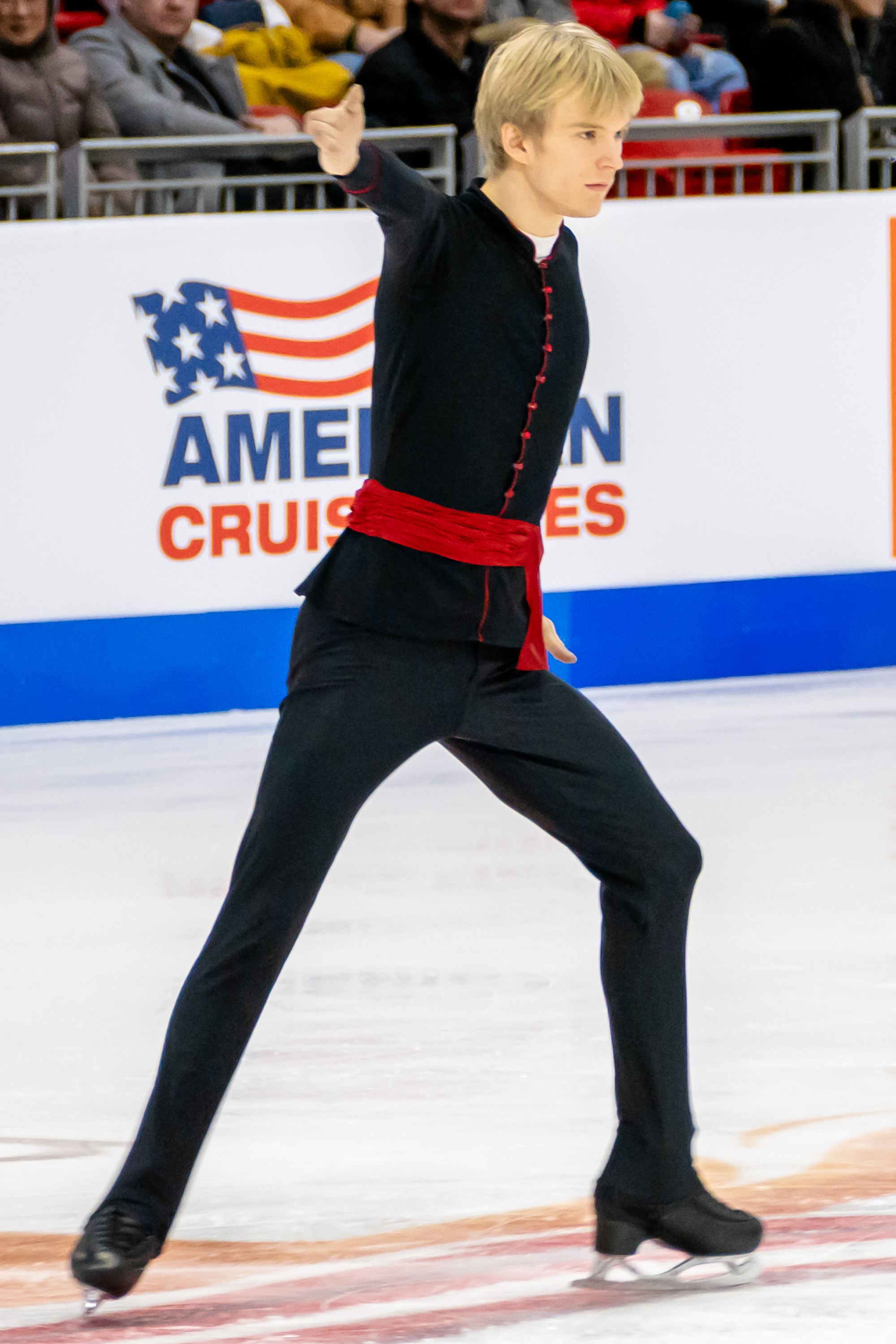
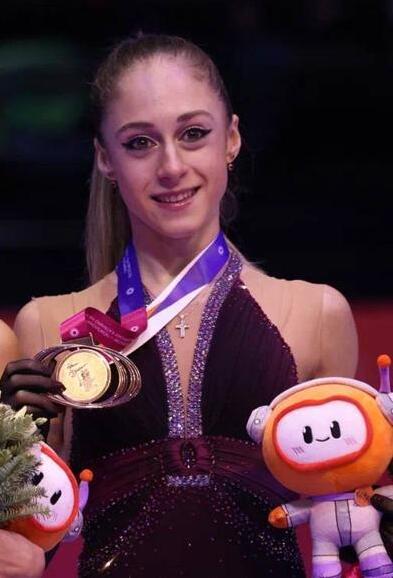
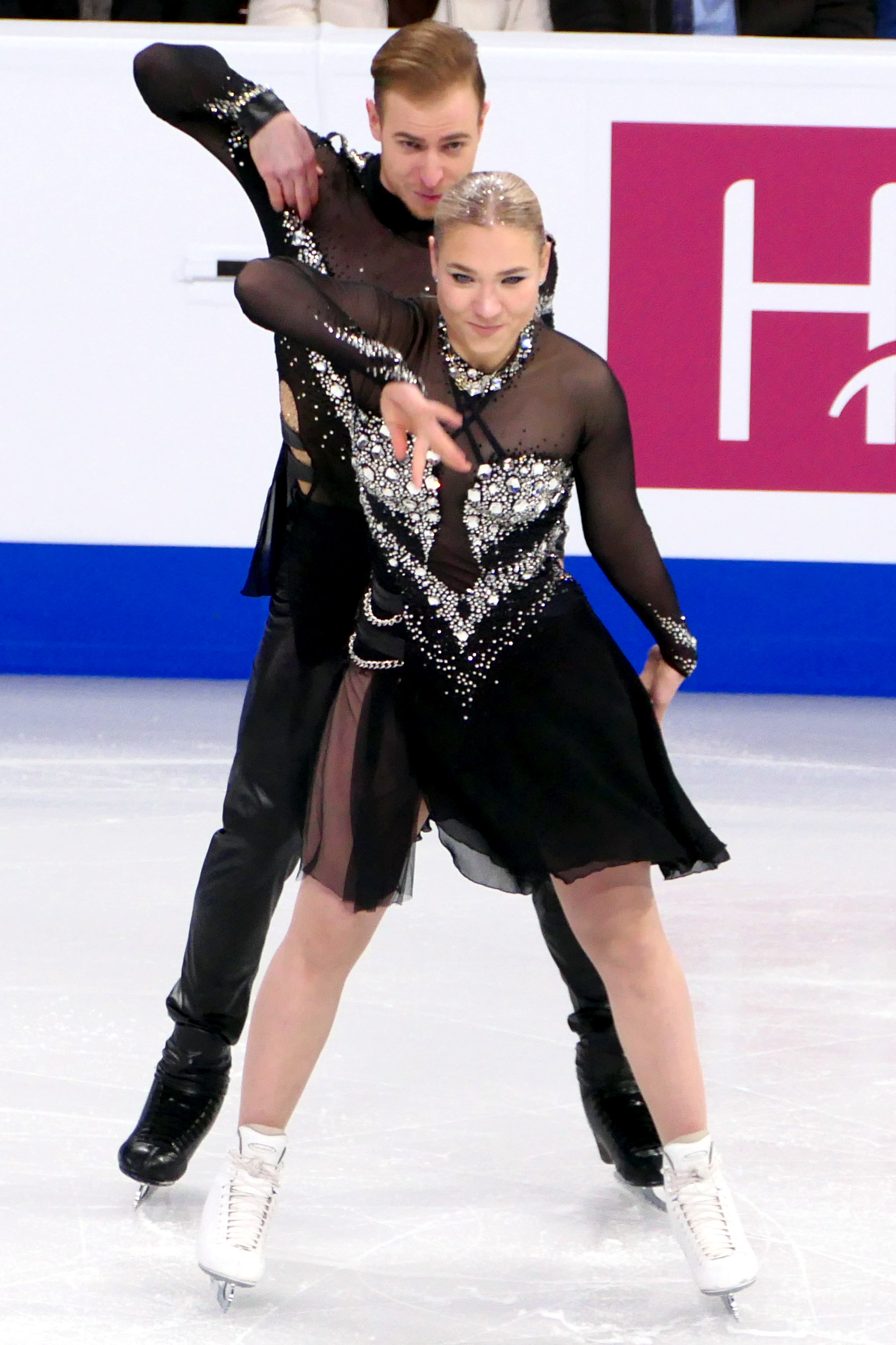
The 2026 Budapest Trophy champions (from left to right): Daniel Grassl of Italy (men's singles); Alina Gorbacheva of Individual Neutral Athlete (women's singles); and Natálie Taschlerová and Filip Taschler of the Czech Republic (ice dance)

Medalists
| Discipline | Gold | Silver | Bronze |
|---|---|---|---|
| Men | (Italy) Daniel Grassl | (United States) Patrick Blackwell | (Switzerland) Lukas Britschgi |
| Women | (Individual Neutral Athletes) Alina Gorbacheva | (Romania) Julia Sauter | (Switzerland) Kimmy Repond |
| Ice dance | (Czech Republic); Natálie Taschlerová; Filip Taschler | (Spain); Olivia Smart; Tim Dieck | (Finland); Yuka Orihara; Juho Pirinen |

== Results ==
=== Men's singles ===
Men's results
| Rank | Skater | Nation | Total points | SP | | FS | |
|---|---|---|---|---|---|---|---|
| 1 | Daniel Grassl | Italy | 268.84 | 1 | 97.14 | 1 | 171.70 |
| 2 | Patrick Blackwell | United States | 242.93 | 5 | 78.44 | 2 | 164.49 |
| 3 | Lukas Britschgi | Switzerland | 240.01 | 4 | 80.05 | 3 | 159.96 |
| 4 | Genrikh Gartung | Germany | 238.45 | 2 | 83.59 | 5 | 154.86 |
| 5 | Kévin Aymoz | France | 226.83 | 11 | 70.63 | 4 | 156.20 |
| 6 | Arlet Levandi | Estonia | 226.06 | 3 | 81.50 | 7 | 144.56 |
| 7 | Tamir Kuperman | Israel | 211.01 | 8 | 74.41 | 8 | 136.60 |
| 8 | Andreas Nordebäck | Sweden | 208.48 | 15 | 62.79 | 6 | 145.69 |
| 9 | Matias Lindfors | Finland | 203.50 | 6 | 77.51 | 12 | 125.99 |
| 10 | John Kim | Canada | 202.94 | 9 | 72.14 | 10 | 130.80 |
| 11 | Vladimir Samoilov | Poland | 195.07 | 21 | 59.59 | 9 | 135.48 |
| 12 | Nikita Starostin | Germany | 192.06 | 13 | 65.85 | 11 | 126.21 |
| 13 | Nikita Sheiko | Israel | 190.02 | 7 | 76.31 | 18 | 113.71 |
| 14 | Wesley Chiu | Canada | 187.10 | 10 | 71.93 | 15 | 115.17 |
| 15 | Taira Shinohara | United States | 184.03 | 14 | 64.91 | 13 | 119.12 |
| 16 | Davide Lewton Brain | Monaco | 176.05 | 22 | 58.20 | 14 | 117.85 |
| 17 | Fedirs Kuļišs | Latvia | 175.86 | 12 | 68.60 | 22 | 107.26 |
| 18 | Nico Steffen | Switzerland | 174.54 | 18 | 60.63 | 17 | 113.91 |
| 19 | Vadym Novikov | Ukraine | 174.53 | 20 | 59.93 | 16 | 114.60 |
| 20 | Nikita Krivosheyev | Kazakhstan | 171.16 | 17 | 61.14 | 19 | 110.02 |
| 21 | Tobia Oellerer | Austria | 168.68 | 19 | 60.59 | 20 | 108.09 |
| 22 | Elias Sayed | Sweden | 167.93 | 16 | 62.40 | 23 | 105.53 |
| 23 | Makar Suntsev | Finland | 164.96 | 23 | 57.10 | 21 | 107.86 |
| 24 | David Sedej | Slovenia | 157.58 | 24 | 57.01 | 25 | 100.57 |
| 25 | Matvii Yefymenko | Poland | 154.62 | 26 | 50.26 | 24 | 104.36 |
| 26 | Pablo García | Spain | 154.02 | 25 | 54.68 | 26 | 99.34 |
| 27 | Douglas Gerber | Australia | 142.75 | 27 | 49.12 | 27 | 93.63 |
| 28 | Aleksei Vlasenko | Hungary | 137.34 | 28 | 44.25 | 28 | 93.09 |

=== Women's singles ===
Women's results
| Rank | Skater | Nation | Total points | SP | | FS | |
|---|---|---|---|---|---|---|---|
| 1 | Alina Gorbacheva | (Individual Neutral Athletes) Individual Neutral Athlete | 203.35 | 1 | 73.02 | 1 | 130.33 |
| 2 | Julia Sauter | Romania | 179.92 | 3 | 65.53 | 4 | 114.39 |
| 3 | Kimmy Repond | Switzerland | 178.86 | 6 | 62.73 | 2 | 116.13 |
| 4 | Maria Eliise Kaljuvere | Estonia | 177.80 | 2 | 66.36 | 7 | 111.44 |
| 5 | Olga Mikutina | Austria | 173.79 | 5 | 62.75 | 8 | 111.04 |
| 6 | Marina Piredda | Italy | 170.81 | 12 | 57.53 | 5 | 113.28 |
| 7 | Anita Östlund | Sweden | 170.19 | 8 | 61.33 | 9 | 108.86 |
| 8 | Sara-Maude Dupuis | Canada | 169.78 | 13 | 56.92 | 6 | 112.86 |
| 9 | Livia Kaiser | Switzerland | 168.07 | 7 | 61.35 | 11 | 106.72 |
| 10 | Mia Risa Gomez | Norway | 167.64 | 18 | 53.23 | 3 | 114.41 |
| 11 | Madeline Schizas | Canada | 167.25 | 9 | 60.10 | 10 | 107.15 |
| 12 | Alina Bonillo | United States | 159.79 | 10 | 57.94 | 15 | 101.85 |
| 13 | Anna Pezzetta | Italy | 159.31 | 15 | 56.10 | 13 | 103.21 |
| 14 | Polina Dzsumanyijazova | Hungary | 158.44 | 14 | 56.21 | 14 | 102.23 |
| 15 | Hannah Frank | Austria | 157.67 | 16 | 54.12 | 12 | 103.55 |
| 16 | Pernille With | Norway | 148.92 | 22 | 50.04 | 16 | 98.88 |
| 17 | Nataly Langerbaur | Estonia | 148.21 | 17 | 53.95 | 17 | 94.26 |
| 18 | Inga Gurgenidze | Georgia | 145.44 | 4 | 63.71 | 26 | 81.73 |
| 19 | Haruna Murakami | Australia | 141.07 | 26 | 47.35 | 18 | 93.72 |
| 20 | Elizabet Gervits | Israel | 138.07 | 24 | 48.94 | 20 | 89.13 |
| 21 | Nikola Fomchenkova | Latvia | 137.28 | 23 | 49.81 | 22 | 87.47 |
| 22 | Julia van Dijk | Netherlands | 135.68 | 28 | 46.72 | 21 | 88.96 |
| 23 | Michaela Vrašťáková | Czech Republic | 135.66 | 29 | 45.93 | 19 | 89.73 |
| 24 | Julia Kasprzyk | Poland | 135.11 | 20 | 51.39 | 23 | 83.72 |
| 25 | Sophie Joline von Felten | United States | 131.05 | 11 | 57.72 | 29 | 73.33 |
| 26 | Alexandra Feigin | Bulgaria | 130.06 | 19 | 51.42 | 28 | 78.64 |
| 27 | Maxine Bautista | Philippines | 130.02 | 27 | 47.18 | 24 | 82.84 |
| 28 | Meda Variakojytė | Lithuania | 127.51 | 30 | 45.31 | 25 | 82.20 |
| 29 | Lotta Artimo | Finland | 127.06 | 25 | 48.26 | 27 | 78.80 |
| 30 | Sofja Stepčenko | Latvia | 118.77 | 21 | 50.22 | 31 | 68.55 |
| 31 | Saskia Oudejans | Netherlands | 103.59 | 34 | 36.80 | 32 | 66.79 |
| 32 | Weronika Ferlin | Poland | 101.52 | 36 | 32.27 | 30 | 69.25 |
| 33 | Mariia Dmitrieva | Israel | 100.44 | 32 | 39.08 | 35 | 61.36 |
| 34 | Lovisa Aav | Sweden | 100.09 | 35 | 34.15 | 33 | 65.94 |
| 35 | Ana Stratulat | Romania | 100.08 | 33 | 38.55 | 34 | 61.53 |
| 36 | Zere Sarbalina | Kazakhstan | 94.87 | 31 | 39.37 | 37 | 55.50 |
| 37 | Annika Lytchoff Skibby | Denmark | 89.06 | 37 | 28.58 | 36 | 60.48 |

=== Ice dance ===
Ice dance results
| Rank | Team | Nation | Total points | RD | | FD | |
|---|---|---|---|---|---|---|---|
| 1 | Natálie Taschlerová; Filip Taschler | Czech Republic | 185.66 | 2 | 76.25 | 1 | 109.41 |
| 2 | Olivia Smart; Tim Dieck | Spain | 185.09 | 1 | 79.42 | 4 | 105.67 |
| 3 | Yuka Orihara; Juho Pirinen | Finland | 182.73 | 4 | 74.10 | 2 | 108.63 |
| 4 | Loïcia Demougeot; Théo le Mercier | France | 178.55 | 3 | 76.00 | 7 | 102.55 |
| 5 | Noemi Maria Tali; Noah Lafornara | Italy | 175.59 | 7 | 69.51 | 3 | 106.08 |
| 6 | Amy Cui; Jonathan Rogers | United States | 174.09 | 9 | 68.50 | 5 | 105.59 |
| 7 | Giulia Isabella Paolino; Andrea Tuba | Italy | 173.74 | 6 | 70.20 | 6 | 103.54 |
| 8 | Iryna Pidgaina; Artem Koval | Ukraine | 171.05 | 8 | 69.38 | 8 | 101.67 |
| 9 | Emily Bratti; Ian Somerville | United States | 165.97 | 5 | 70.58 | 12 | 95.39 |
| 10 | Jamie Fournier; Everest Zhu | Canada | 164.90 | 10 | 66.14 | 10 | 98.76 |
| 11 | Vasilisa Grigoreva; Evgenii Artiushchenko | Individual Neutral Athletes | 163.00 | 12 | 61.57 | 9 | 101.43 |
| 12 | Milana Kuzmina; Dmitrii Studenikin | Individual Neutral Athletes | 157.29 | 13 | 60.44 | 11 | 96.85 |
| 13 | Charise Matthaei; Max Liebers | Germany | 154.56 | 11 | 64.90 | 14 | 89.66 |
| 14 | Shira Ichilov; Mikhail Nosovitskiy | Israel | 146.97 | 20 | 54.77 | 13 | 92.20 |
| 15 | Zofia Grzegorzewska; Oleg Muratov | Poland | 146.54 | 14 | 58.20 | 17 | 88.34 |
| 16 | Chloe Nguyen; Brendan Giang | Canada | 145.22 | 16 | 56.47 | 16 | 88.75 |
| 17 | Gina Zehnder; Beda Leon Sieber | Switzerland | 144.38 | 19 | 55.30 | 15 | 89.08 |
| 18 | Alisa Ovsiankina; Maximilien Rahier | France | 137.55 | 21 | 50.90 | 18 | 86.65 |
| 19 | Anita Straub; Andreas Straub | Austria | 136.44 | 18 | 55.41 | 19 | 81.03 |
| 20 | Emise Csiszér; Mark Shapiro | Hungary | 132.01 | 15 | 56.95 | 20 | 75.06 |
| 21 | Philomene Sabourin; Raul Bermejo | Spain | 125.73 | 17 | 55.67 | 21 | 70.06 |
| 22 | Luiza-Elena Ilie; Giovanni Stefano Poli | Romania | 94.33 | 22 | 37.00 | 22 | 57.33 |

== Works cited ==
- "Sports Rules – Single & Pair Skating and Ice Dance" (PDF). International Skating Union. Archived (PDF) from the original on 24 May 2026.
