= 100 Black Coffins =

Single by Rick Ross

from the album Django Unchained (soundtrack)
- Released: 2013
- Recorded: 2012
- Genre: Hip hop
- Length: 3:43
- Label: Maybach Music Group, Def Jam, Warner Bros. Records
- Songwriter: Jamie Foxx
- Producers: Jamie Foxx, Ainz Brainz Prasad

"100 Black Coffins" is a song by American rapper Rick Ross, taken from the soundtrack to Quentin Tarantino's film Django Unchained. It was produced during filming by actor and R&B singer Jamie Foxx, who also plays the lead role of Django in the film.

It peaked at #100 in Germany and #69 in France, becoming one of Ross' most successful singles in Germany and his most successful single in France.

== Charts ==
Chart (2012–13)	Peak position
France (SNEP)	69
Germany (GfK)	100
