= Django Unchained (soundtrack) =

2012 soundtrack album by Various Artists

Soundtrack album by Various Artists
- Released: December 18, 2012
- Genres: Film score; folk rock; R&B; hip hop
- Length: 54:31
- Languages: English; Italian
- Labels: Republic; Loma Vista
- Producers: Brainz Dimilo; Brother Dege; Daniel Beard; Elisa Toffoli; Ennio Morricone; Jamie Foxx; Pilar Savone; Primo; Reginald Hudlin; RZA; Stacey Sher; Terry Cashman; Tommy West; Tony Daigle; Wooten Kelvin

Singles from Django Unchained (soundtrack)
- 1. "100 Black Coffins" Released: 1 December 2012; 2. "Ancora qui" Released: 4 January 2013

Django Unchained is the soundtrack to Quentin Tarantino's motion picture Django Unchained. It was originally released on December 18, 2012. The soundtrack uses a variety of music genres, though with an especially heavy influence from Spaghetti Western soundtracks.

Tracks composed for the film are "100 Black Coffins" by Rick Ross and produced by and featuring Jamie Foxx, "Who Did That To You?" by John Legend, "Freedom" by Anthony Hamilton and Elayna Boynton, "Ancora qui" by Ennio Morricone and Elisa. These four songs were all eligible for an Academy Award nomination in the Best Original Song category, but none of them were nominated.

The soundtrack also includes seven tracks that are dialogue excerpts from the film. It was nominated for a Grammy Award for Best Compilation Soundtrack for Visual Media.

== Critical reception and controversy ==
Professional ratings
Review scores
Source	Rating
AllMusic	3.5/5 stars
Artistdirect	5/5 stars
Digital Spy	4/5 stars
Now	3/5 stars
Pitchfork Media	(5.8/10)
Rolling Stone	4/5 stars
The Courier-Journal	2.5/5 stars
The Telegraph	3/5 stars

Despite the fact that the soundtrack was acclaimed by critics, Ennio Morricone, who composed a brand new song for Django Unchained, stated that Tarantino used the music "without coherence" and he "wouldn’t like to work with him again, on anything". That was the first collaboration between the Italian composer and the American filmmaker, even though Tarantino had used Morricone's music in Kill Bill, Death Proof, and Inglourious Basterds. Ennio Morricone quickly released a statement clarifying that his remarks were taken out of context, Morricone said that he has "great respect for Tarantino" and that he is "glad he chooses my music" Morricone also said that because Tarantino chooses his music "it is a sign of artistic brotherhood." Morricone went on to compose the score to Tarantino's next film, The Hateful Eight.

In a scholarly essay on the film's music, Hollis Robbins notes that the vast majority of film music borrowings come from films made between 1966 and 1974 and argues that the political and musical resonances of these allusions situate Django Unchained squarely in the Vietnam and Watergate era, during the rise and decline of Black Power cinema.

== Track listing ==
No.	Title	Writer(s)	Artist(s)	Length
1.	"Winged" (Dialogue)		James Russo	0:09
2.	"Django (Note: Originally from the 1966 film Django)"	Luis Bacalov	Rocky Roberts & Luis Bacalov	2:53
3.	"The Braying Mule (Note: Originally from the 1970 film Two Mules for Sister Sara)"	Ennio Morricone	Ennio Morricone	2:33
4.	"In That Case Django, After You..." (Dialogue)		Christoph Waltz & Jamie Foxx	0:38
5.	"Lo Chiamavano King (His Name Was King) (Note: Originally from the 1971 film His Name Was King)"	Bacalov	Luis Bacalov & Edda Dell'Orso	1:58
6.	"Freedom"	Anthony Hamilton; Elayna Boynton; Kelvin Wooten	Anthony Hamilton & Elayna Boynton	3:56
7.	"Five-Thousand-Dollar Nigga's and Gummy Mouth Bitches" (Dialogue)		Don Johnson & Christoph Waltz	0:56
8.	"La Corsa (2nd Version)"	Bacalov	Luis Bacalov	2:18
9.	"Sneaky Schultz and the Demise of Sharp" (Dialogue)		Don Stroud	0:34
10.	"I Got a Name (Note: Originally from the 1973 film The Last American Hero)"	Norman Gimbel; Charles Fox	Jim Croce	3:15
11.	"I Giorni Dell'ira (Days of Anger) (Note: Originally from the 1967 film Day of Anger)"	Riziero Ortolani	Riz Ortolani	3:05
12.	"100 Black Coffins"	Jamie Foxx; Rick Ross	Rick Ross	3:43
13.	"Nicaragua (Note: Originally from the 1983 film Under Fire)"	Jerry Goldsmith	Jerry Goldsmith featuring Pat Metheny	3:29
14.	"Hildi's Hot Box" (Dialogue)		Samuel L. Jackson & Leonardo DiCaprio	1:16
15.	"Sister Sara's Theme"	Morricone	Ennio Morricone	1:26
16.	"Ancora Qui"	Elisa Toffoli; Morricone	Ennio Morricone & Elisa	5:08
17.	"Unchained (The Payback/Untouchable) (Note: Features dialogue by Jamie Foxx, Christoph Waltz & James Remar)"	James Brown; Fred Wesley; John Starks; Tupac Shakur	James Brown & 2Pac	2:51
18.	"Who Did That to You?"	John Stephens; Paul Epworth	John Legend	3:48
19.	"Too Old to Die Young"	Dege Legg	Brother Dege	3:43
20.	"Stephen the Poker Player" (Dialogue)		Samuel L. Jackson	1:02
21.	"Un Monumento (Note: Originally from the 1967 film The Hellbenders)"	Morricone	Ennio Morricone	2:30
22.	"Six Shots Two Guns" (Dialogue)		Samuel L. Jackson & Jamie Foxx	0:05
23.	"Titoli (Trinity) (Note: Originally from the 1970 film They Call Me Trinity)"	Franco Micalizzi; Lally Stott	Annibale E I Cantori Moderni	3:03
Total length:				54:31

iTunes bonus track
No.	Title	Writer(s)	Artist(s)	Length
24.	"Ode to Django (The D Is Silent) (Note: Samples dialogue clips from this film and the 1966 film Django)"	RZA	RZA	4:58
Total length:				59:16

== Film music not included on the album ==
1. "Rito Finale" - Ennio Morricone
2. "Norme Con Ironie" - Ennio Morricone
3. "Town of Silence (2nd Version)" - Luis Bacalov
4. "Gavotte" - Grace Collins
5. "Town of Silence" - Luis Bacalov
6. "Requiem and Prologue" - Masamichi Amano & Warsaw Philharmonic Orchestra
7. "The Big Risk" - Ennio Morricone
8. "Minacciosamente Lontano" - Ennio Morricone
9. "Blue Dark Waltz" - Luis Bacalov
10. "Für Elise" - Ashley Toman
11. "Freedom (Motherless Child)" (edited from Woodstock: Music from the Original Soundtrack and More) - Richie Havens
12. "Ain't No Grave (Black Opium Remix) "J2 and Steven Stern" - Johnny Cash
13. "Dopo la congiura" - Ennio Morricone

== Personnel ==
- Executive Music Producer: Quentin Tarantino
- Music Supervisor: Mary Ramos
- Soundtrack Producers: Stacey Sher, Reginald Hudlin, Pilar Savone, and Holly Adams
- Label Soundtrack Producer: Tom Whalley

== Chart positions ==
=== Weekly charts ===
Chart (2013–2015)	Peak position
Australian Albums (ARIA)	39
Austrian Albums (Ö3 Austria)	3
Belgian Albums (Ultratop Flanders)	13
Belgian Albums (Ultratop Wallonia)	37
Croatian International Albums (HDU)	25
Danish Albums (Hitlisten)	14
Dutch Albums (Album Top 100)	56
French Albums (IFOP)	7
French Albums (SNEP)	7
German Albums (Offizielle Top 100)	3
Greek Albums (IFPI)	25
Hungarian Albums (MAHASZ)	14
Irish Compilation Albums (IRMA)	2
Italian Compilation Albums (FIMI)	2
New Zealand Albums (RMNZ)	45
Norwegian Albums (VG-lista)	16
Polish Albums (ZPAV)	5
Swiss Albums (Schweizer Hitparade)	1
UK Soundtrack Albums (Official Charts)	2
US Billboard 200	53
US Digital Albums (Billboard)	36
US Soundtrack Albums (Billboard)	4

=== Year-end charts ===
Chart (2013)	Position
Austrian Albums (Ö3 Austria)	33
Belgian Albums (Ultratop Flanders)	60
Belgian Albums (Ultratop Wallonia)	184
Danish Albums (Hitlisten)	78
French Albums (IFOP)	49
French Albums (SNEP)	49
German Albums (Offizielle Top 100)	38
Swiss Albums (Schweizer Hitparade)	30
US Soundtrack Albums (Billboard)	16

== Certifications ==
Region	Certification	Certified units/sales
Austria (IFPI Austria)	3× Platinum	60,000^{*}
Germany (BVMI)	Gold	100,000^{^}
Italy (FIMI)	Gold	25,000^{*}
^{*} Sales figures based on certification alone.^{^} Shipments figures based on certification alone.

== Singles ==
Individual tracks have been released as singles and charted on a number of official charts.

Year	Single	Peak positions					References
Year	Single	AUT	FRA	GER	ITA	SWI	References
2012	"Freedom" (Anthony Hamilton & Elayna Boynton)	46	28	55	—	32	
2013	"Ancora qui" (Elisa & Ennio Morricone)	—	—	—	41	—	

== Accolades ==
Ceremony	Year	Category	Nominated work	Result	Ref.
Academy Awards	2013	Best Original Song	"Ancora qui" (Elisa and Ennio Morricone)	Shortlisted	
Academy Awards	2013	Best Original Song	"Freedom" (John Legend and Paul Epworth)	Shortlisted	
Academy Awards	2013	Best Original Song	"Who Did That to You?" (Elisa and Ennio Morricone)	Shortlisted	
Academy Awards	2013	Best Original Song	"100 Black Coffins" (Elisa and Ennio Morricone)	Shortlisted	
Black Reel Awards	2013	Outstanding Original or Adapted Song	"Freedom" (John Legend and Paul Epworth)	Won	
Georgia Film Critics Association	2012	Best Original Song	"Ancora qui"	Nominated	
Grammy Awards	2013	Best Compilation Soundtrack for Visual Media	Django Unchained (Original Soundtrack)	Nominated	
St. Louis Film Critics Association	2012	Best Music	Django Unchained (Original Soundtrack)	Won	
