= Love in the Dark (song) =

Song by Adele

from the album 25
- Released: 20 November 2015
- Studio: Smecky (Prague)
- Genre: Torch ballad
- Length: 4:46
- Label: XL
- Songwriters: Adele Adkins; Samuel Dixon
- Producer: Dixon

"Love in the Dark" is a song by English singer and songwriter Adele from her third studio album, 25 (2015). The song was written by Adele Adkins and Samuel Dixon. It charted at number 39, 79, 65, 52 and 76 on France, Germany, Netherlands, Sweden and in the UK Singles Chart, respectively as well as charting at number 54 on the Global 200, primarily following the release of her single "Easy on Me" in 2021.

== Composition ==
"Love in the Dark" is a torch ballad song which is written in the key of A minor and it is composed in common time (4/4 time).

== Meaning ==
"Love in the Dark" is a slow, sad, beautiful song from Adele, and it's likely based on a lot of what 21 was based on. Adele has said that 25 is a make-up album, as opposed to 21 which was a break-up album. However, in this song, Adele does reach back for a little of what made her famous and executes it skillfully in this song.

== Credits and personnel ==
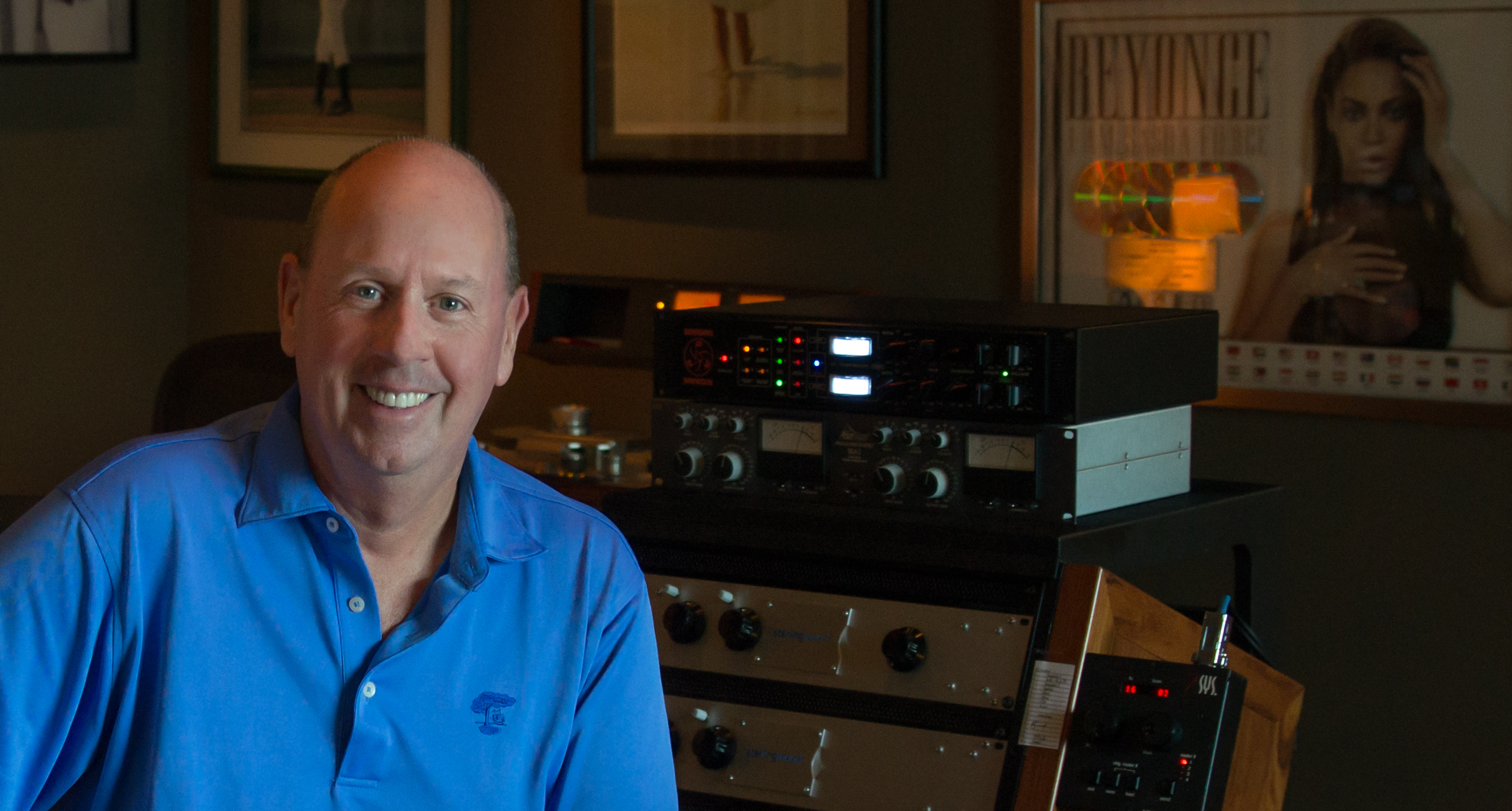
Tom Coyne

- Adele – vocals, songwriting, writing
- Samuel Dixon – piano and synthesizer, producer and engineer, songwriting, writing
- FILMharmonic Orchestra – strings
- Adam Klemens – conductor
- Oliver Kraus – string arrangement
- Petr Pycha – orchestra contractor
- Tom Coyne – mastering
- Cameron Craig – engineer
- Tom Elmhirst – mixing
- Jan Holzner – engineer
- Randy Merrill – mastering

== Charts ==
=== Weekly charts ===
2015 weekly chart performance
Chart (2015)	Peak position
Canada Hot Digital Songs (Billboard)	33
France (SNEP)	39
Germany (GfK)	79
US Bubbling Under Hot 100 (Billboard)	11

2021 weekly chart performance
Chart (2021)	Peak position
France (SNEP)	110
Global 200 (Billboard)	54
Netherlands (Single Top 100)	65
Norway (VG-lista)	37
Sweden (Sverigetopplistan)	49
UK Singles (Official Charts)	76

=== Monthly charts ===
Monthly chart performance
Chart (2026)	Peak position
Russia Streaming (TopHit)	94

== Certifications ==
Certifications and sales for "Love in the Dark"
Region	Certification	Certified units/sales
Canada (Music Canada)	Platinum	80,000^{‡}
Denmark (IFPI Danmark)	Gold	45,000^{‡}
Italy (FIMI)	Gold	50,000^{‡}
New Zealand (RMNZ)	2× Platinum	60,000^{‡}
Spain (Promusicae)	Gold	30,000^{‡}
United Kingdom (BPI)	2× Platinum	1,200,000^{‡}
^{‡} Sales+streaming figures based on certification alone.
