= Elayna Boynton =

American indie soul singer

Elayna Boynton is an American indie soul singer.

She lived in Southern California before moving to Nashville to pursue her career. In 2009 she returned to California. Her debut album was released in 2016. She appeared on the Django Unchained soundtrack with the track "Freedom" alongside Anthony Hamilton co-written by the two artists. The song has been particularly popular in European charts including France, Austria and Switzerland. She also sang an Aretha Franklin's "One Room Paradise" cover for an IKEA advertisement. Her cover of Leonard Cohen's "Come Healing" was featured on the soundtrack of the July 2019 film The Farewell.

== Discography ==
=== Albums ===
- 2016: ElaynaEP

=== Singles ===
Year	Single	Chart positions			Album
Year	Single	AUT	FR	SUI	Album
2013	"Freedom" (with Anthony Hamilton)	46	28	32	Django Unchained soundtrack
2016	"Honey I told you"				Single on SoundCloud
