= 2026–27 ISU Challenger Series =

Figure skating competition

- Type: ISU Challenger Series
- Date: August 6, 2026 – February 13, 2027
- Season: 2026–27
- Previous: 2025–26 ISU Challenger Series
- Next: 2027–28 ISU Challenger Series

The 2026–27 ISU Challenger Series is a series of senior international competitions organized by the International Skating Union that were held from August 2026 to February 2027. It is the twelfth season of the ISU Challenger Series, a group of senior-level international figure skating competitions. Skaters were eligible to compete in the Challenger Series if they have reached the age of 17 before July 1, 2026.

== Competitions ==
The International Skating Union announced the Challenger Series schedule on June 16, 2026. This season, the series comprised the following events.

Date	Event	Location	Notes	Ref.
August 6–9	(United States) 2026 Cranberry Cup International	Norwood, Massachusetts, United States	Men's and women's singles only	
September 4–6	(Japan) 2026 Kinoshita Group Cup	Tokyo, Japan	—N/a	
September 11–12	(United States) 2026 John Nicks International Pairs Competition	Norwood, Massachusetts, United States	Pairs only	
September 17–20	(Italy) 2026 Lombardia Trophy	Bergamo, Italy	No pairs	
September 24–26	(Germany) 2026 Nebelhorn Trophy	Oberstdorf, Germany	—N/a	
September 24–27	(Slovakia) 2026 Nepela Memorial	Bratislava, Slovakia	No pairs	
September 30 – October 3	(Georgia (country)) 2026 Trialeti Trophy	Batumi, Georgia	—N/a	
October 7–11	(Kazakhstan) 2026 Denis Ten Memorial Challenge	Almaty, Kazakhstan	No pairs	
October 15–18	(Hungary) 2026 Budapest Trophy	Budapest, Hungary	No pairs	
November 16–22	(Estonia) 2026 Tallinn Trophy	Tallinn, Estonia	—N/a	
November 25–29	(Poland) 2026 Warsaw Cup	Warsaw, Poland	—N/a	
December 2–5	(Croatia) 2026 Golden Spin of Zagreb	Zagreb, Croatia	No pairs	
February 10–13	(Austria) 2027 Ice Challenge	Graz, Austria	—N/a	

== Medal summary ==
=== Men's singles ===
Challenger Series
Competition	Gold	Silver	Bronze	Ref.
(United States) Cranberry Cup International	(Estonia) Aleksandr Selevko	(United States) Daniel Martynov	(Israel) Mark Gorodnitsky	
(Japan) Kinoshita Group Cup	(Individual Neutral Athletes) Vladislav Dikidzhi	(Japan) Shun Sato	(Individual Neutral Athletes) Evgeni Semenenko	
(Italy) Lombardia Trophy	(Estonia) Mihhail Selevko	(Individual Neutral Athletes) Matvei Vetlugin	(France) Corentin Spinar	
(Germany) Nebelhorn Trophy	(Estonia) Aleksandr Selevko	(Germany) Genrikh Gartung	(France) François Pitot	
(Slovakia) Nepela Memorial	(Individual Neutral Athletes) Evgeni Semenenko	(Italy) Daniel Grassl	(Kazakhstan) Mikhail Shaidorov	
(Georgia (country)) Trialeti Trophy	(Georgia (country)) Nika Egadze	(Individual Neutral Athletes) Nikolai Ugozhaev	(Estonia) Mihhail Selevko	
(Kazakhstan) Denis Ten Memorial Challenge	(Individual Neutral Athletes) Vladislav Dikidzhi	(Individual Neutral Athletes) Gleb Lutfullin	(Individual Neutral Athletes) Petr Gumennik	
(Hungary) Budapest Trophy	(Italy) Daniel Grassl	(United States) Patrick Blackwell	(Switzerland) Lukas Britschgi	
(Estonia) Tallinn Trophy	(Italy) Gabriele Frangipani	(Canada) Anthony Paradis	(South Korea) Kim Hyun-gyeom	

=== Women's singles ===
Challenger Series
Competition	Gold	Silver	Bronze	Ref.
(United States) Cranberry Cup International	(South Korea) Kim Yu-seong	(South Korea) Kim Yu-jae	(United States) Logan Higase-Chen	
(Japan) Kinoshita Group Cup	(Japan) Mao Shimada	(Individual Neutral Athletes) Alexandra Ignatova	(Individual Neutral Athletes) Anna Frolova	
(Italy) Lombardia Trophy	(Estonia) Niina Petrokina	(South Korea) Shin Ji-a	(Italy) Lara Naki Gutmann	
(Germany) Nebelhorn Trophy	(Norway) Mia Risa Gomez	(Italy) Marina Piredda	(Canada) Fee Ann Landry	
(Slovakia) Nepela Memorial	(South Korea) Kim Yu-seong	(South Korea) Lee Hae-in	(Slovakia) Olivia Lengyelová	
(Georgia (country)) Trialeti Trophy	(Estonia) Niina Petrõkina	(Individual Neutral Athletes) Adeliia Petrosian	(Individual Neutral Athletes) Anna Frolova	
(Kazakhstan) Denis Ten Memorial Challenge	(Individual Neutral Athletes) Alexandra Ignatova	(South Korea) Kim Yu-jae	(Kazakhstan) Sofia Samodelkina	
(Hungary) Budapest Trophy	(Individual Neutral Athletes) Alina Gorbacheva	(Romania) Julia Sauter	(Switzerland) Kimmy Repond	
(Estonia) Tallinn Trophy	(Italy) Lara Naki Gutmann	(Estonia) Maria Eliise Kaljuvere	(Canada) Breken Brezden	

=== Pairs ===
Challenger Series
Competition	Gold	Silver	Bronze	Ref.
(Japan) Kinoshita Group Cup	(Individual Neutral Athletes); Aleksandra Boikova; Dmitrii Kozlovskii	(Individual Neutral Athletes); Ekaterina Chikmareva; Matvei Ianchenkov	(Individual Neutral Athletes); Anastasia Mukhortova; Dmitry Evgenyev	
(United States) John Nicks Pairs Challenge	(Individual Neutral Athletes); Aleksandra Boikova; Dmitrii Kozlovskii	(United States); Audrey Shin; Spencer Akira Howe	(United States); Katie McBeath; Balazs Nagy	
(Germany) Nebelhorn Trophy	(Canada); Lia Pereira; Trennt Michaud	(United States); Audrey Shin; Spencer Akira Howe	(China); Zhang Jiaxuan; Huang Yihang	
(Georgia (country)) Trialeti Trophy	(Georgia (country)); Anastasia Metelkina; Luka Berulava	(Individual Neutral Athletes); Anastasia Mishina; Aleksandr Galliamov	(Individual Neutral Athletes); Ekaterina Chikmareva; Matvei Ianchenkov	
(Estonia) Tallinn Trophy	(United States); Linzy Fitzpatrick; Keyton Bearinger	(Canada); Miyu Yunoki; Tristan Taylor	(United States); Reagan Moss; Jakub Galbavy	

=== Ice dance ===
Challenger Series
Competition	Gold	Silver	Bronze	Ref.
(Japan) Kinoshita Group Cup	(Georgia (country)); Diana Davis; Gleb Smolkin	(Individual Neutral Athletes); Vasilisa Kaganovskaia; Maxim Nekrasov	(Czech Republic); Natálie Taschlerová; Filip Taschler	
(Italy) Lombardia Trophy	(Czech Republic); Kateřina Mrázková; Daniel Mrázek	(France); Evgeniia Lopareva; Geoffrey Brissaud	(United States); Emily Bratti; Ian Somerville	
(Germany) Nebelhorn Trophy	(United States); Christina Carreira; Anthony Ponomarenko	(Canada); Marie-Jade Lauriault; Romain Le Gac	(Australia); Holly Harris; Jason Chan	
(Slovakia) Nepela Memorial	(Spain); Olivia Smart; Tim Dieck	(Finland); Juulia Turkkila; Matthias Versluis	(United States); Oona Brown; Gage Brown	
(Georgia (country)) Trialeti Trophy	(Georgia (country)); Diana Davis; Gleb Smolkin	(Individual Neutral Athletes); Elizaveta Pasechnik; Dario Cirisano	(Hungary); Mariia Ignateva; Danijil Szemko	
(Kazakhstan) Denis Ten Memorial Challenge	(Finland); Juulia Turkkila; Matthias Versluis	(Individual Neutral Athletes); Vasilisa Kaganovskaia; Maxim Nekrasov	(United States); Caroline Green; Michael Parsons	
(Hungary) Budapest Trophy	(Czech Republic); Natálie Taschlerová; Filip Taschler	(Spain); Olivia Smart; Tim Dieck	(Finland); Yuka Orihara; Juho Pirinen	
(Estonia) Tallinn Trophy	(Australia); Holly Harris; Jason Chan	(Canada); Alicia Fabbri; Marko Jevgeni Gaidajenko	(United States); Amy Cui; Jonathan Rogers	

== Medal table ==
Rank	Nation	Gold	Silver	Bronze	Total
1	Individual Neutral Athletes	7	10	6	23
2	Estonia	5	1	1	7
3	Georgia	4	0	0	4
4	Italy	3	2	1	6
5	United States	2	4	7	13
6	South Korea	2	4	1	7
7	Czech Republic	2	0	1	3
8	Canada	1	4	2	7
9	Finland	1	1	1	3
10	Japan	1	1	0	2
10	Spain	1	1	0	2
12	Australia	1	0	1	2
13	Norway	1	0	0	1
14	France	0	1	2	3
15	Germany	0	1	0	1
15	Romania	0	1	0	1
17	Kazakhstan	0	0	2	2
17	Switzerland	0	0	2	2
19	China	0	0	1	1
19	Hungary	0	0	1	1
19	Israel	0	0	1	1
19	Slovakia	0	0	1	1
Totals (22 entries)		31	31	31	93
