= 2026 CS Kinoshita Group Cup =

Figure skating competition

- Type: ISU Challenger Series
- Date: September 4 – 6
- Season: 2026–27
- Location: Tokyo, Japan
- Host: Japan Skating Federation
- Venue: Tokyo Tatsumi Ice Arena

Champions
- Men's singles: (Individual Neutral Athletes) Vladislav Dikidzhi
- Women's singles: (Japan) Mao Shimada
- Pairs: (Individual Neutral Athletes) Aleksandra Boikova and Dmitrii Kozlovskii
- Ice dance: (Georgia (country)) Diana Davis and Gleb Smolkin
- Previous: 2025 CS Kinoshita Group Cup
- Previous CS: 2026 CS Cranberry Cup International
- Next CS: 2026 CS John Nicks International Pairs Competition

The 2026 Kinoshita Group Cup is a figure skating competition sanctioned by the International Skating Union (ISU), organized and hosted by the Japan Skating Federation, and the second event of the 2026–27 ISU Challenger Series. It was held at the Tokyo Tatsumi Ice Arena in Tokyo, Japan, from September 4 to 6, 2026. Medals were awarded in men's singles, women's singles, pair skating, and ice dance, and skaters earned ISU World Standing points based on their results. Vladislav Dikidzhi of Individual Neutral Athlete, won the men's event; Mao Shimada of Japan won the women's event; Aleksandra Boikova and Dmitrii Kozlovskii of Individual Neutral Athletes, won the pairs' event; and Diana Davis and Gleb Smolkin of Georgia won the ice dance event.

== Background ==
The ISU Challenger Series was introduced in 2014. It is a series of international figure skating competitions sanctioned by the International Skating Union (ISU) and organized by ISU member nations. The objective was to ensure consistent organization and structure within a series of international competitions linked together, providing opportunities for senior-level skaters to compete at the international level and also earn ISU World Standing points. The 2026–27 Challenger Series consists of eleven events, of which the Kinoshita Group Cup is the second. The 2026 Kinoshita Group Cup will be held at the Tokyo Tatsumi Ice Arena in Tokyo, Japan, from September 4 to 6, 2026.

On June 30, 2026, the ISU announced that figure skaters from Russia and Belarus would be allowed to compete at international competitions as Individual Neutral Athletes (AINs). Each skater was required to undergo an individual assessment conducted by the ISU Council to determine whether they met the criteria for neutral status. These requirements included having not previously taken active part in the war in Ukraine, as well as having not actively and publicly supported the war. As AINs, Russian and Belarusian skaters were required to compete without items of state recognition such as their national flags or anthems.

== Changes to preliminary assignments ==
The International Skating Union published the preliminary list of entrants on August 10, 2026.

Date	Discipline	Withdrew	Added	Ref.
August 17	Ice dance	(United States); Leah Neset; Artem Markelov	—N/a	
August 19	Women	(United States); Sonja Hilmer	—N/a	
August 20	Men	(South Korea); Lim Ju-heon	—N/a	
August 31	Men	(Japan); Sōta Yamamoto	—N/a	
September 1	Women	(Japan); Mone Chiba	—N/a	
September 1	Men	(Individual Neutral Athletes); Mark Kondratiuk	(Individual Neutral Athletes); Vladislav Dikidzhi	

== Required performance elements ==
=== Single skating ===
Men and women competing in single skating first perform their short programs on September 4. Lasting no more than 2 minutes 40 seconds, the short program has to include the following elements:

For men: one double or triple Axel; one triple or quadruple jump; one jump combination consisting of a double jump and a triple jump, two triple jumps, or a quadruple jump and a double jump or triple jump; one flying spin; one camel spin or sit spin with a change of foot; one spin combination with a change of foot; and one step sequence using the full ice surface.

For women: one double or triple Axel; one triple jump; one jump combination consisting of a double jump and a triple jump, or two triple jumps; one flying spin; one layback spin, sideways leaning spin, camel spin, or sit spin without a change of foot; one spin combination with a change of foot; and one step sequence using the full ice surface.

Men perform their free skates on September 5, while women perform theirs on September 6. The free skate can last no more than 4 minutes, and has to include the following: six jump elements, of which one has to be an Axel-type jump; three spins, of which one has to be a spin combination, one a flying spin, and one a choreographic spin; one step sequence; and a choreographic sequence.

=== Pair skating ===
Couples competing in pair skating first perform their short programs on September 5. Lasting no more than 2 minutes 40 seconds, the short program has to include the following elements: one pair lift, one double or triple twist lift, one double or triple throw jump, one double or triple solo jump, one pair spin combination, one death spiral, and one step sequence using the full ice surface.

Couples then perform their free skates on September 6. The free skate can last no more than 4 minutes, and has to include the following: two pair lifts, one twist lift, two different throw jumps, one solo jump, one jump combination or sequence, one choreographic pair spin, and one death spiral.

=== Ice dance ===
Couples competing in ice dance first perform their rhythm dances on September 5. Lasting no more than 2 minutes 50 seconds, the theme of the rhythm dance this season is "Rhythm and Waltz". The rhythm dance has to include the following elements: one section of the Golden Waltz pattern dance, one creative dance element, one dance lift, one set of sequential twizzles, and one step sequence while not touching.

Couples then perform their free dances on September 6. The free dance can last no longer than 4 minutes, and has to include the following: three dance lifts or one short lift and one combination lift; one dance spin; one step sequence in hold; one set of synchronized twizzles, one one-foot turns sequence in hold, and two choreographic elements.

== Judging ==
Skaters are judged according to the required technical elements of their program (such as jumps and spins), as well as the overall presentation of their program, based on three program components (skating skills, presentation, and composition). Each technical element in a figure skating performance is assigned a predetermined base point value and scored by a panel of nine judges on a scale from −5 to +5 based on the quality of its execution. Each Grade of Execution (GOE) from –5 to +5 is assigned a value as indicated on the Scale of Values. For example, a triple Axel is worth a base value of 8.00 points, and a GOE of +3 is worth 2.40 points, so a triple Axel with a GOE of +3 earns 10.40 points. The judging panel's GOE for each element is determined by calculating the trimmed mean (the average after discarding the highest and lowest scores). The panel's scores for all elements are added together to generate a Total Elements Score. At the same time, the judges evaluate each performance based on the five aforementioned program components and assign each a score from 0.25 to 10 in 0.25-point increments. The judging panel's final score for each program component is also determined by calculating the trimmed mean. Those scores are then multiplied by the factor shown on the chart below; the results are added together to generate a total Program Component Score.

Program component factoring
Discipline	Short program or rhythm dance	Free skate or free dance
Men	1.67	3.33
Women	1.33	2.67
Pairs	1.33	2.67
Ice dance	1.33	2.00

Deductions are applied for certain violations, such as time infractions, stops and restarts, or falls. The Total Elements Score and Program Component Score are then added together, minus any deductions, to generate a final performance score for each skater or team.

== Medal summary ==
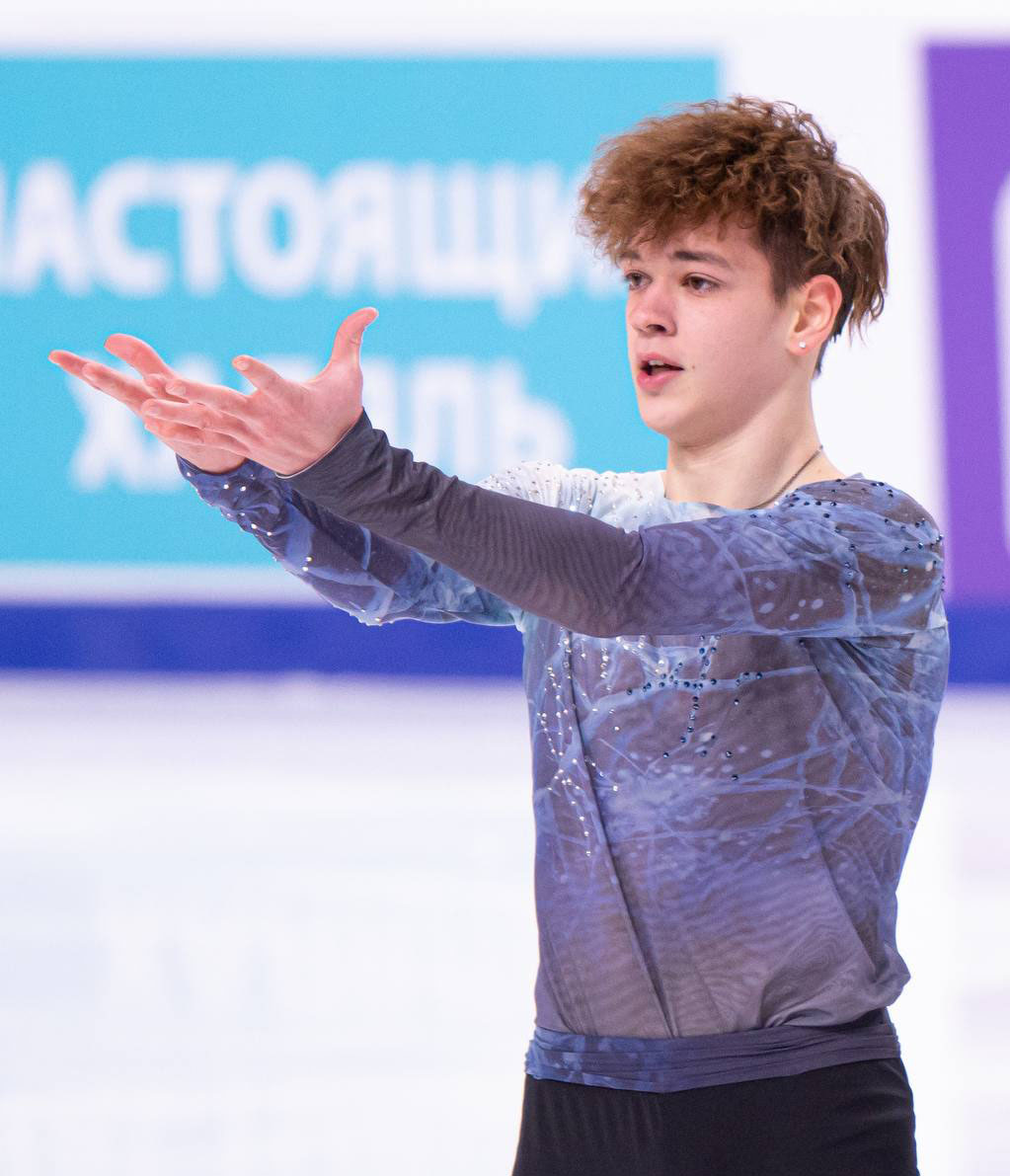
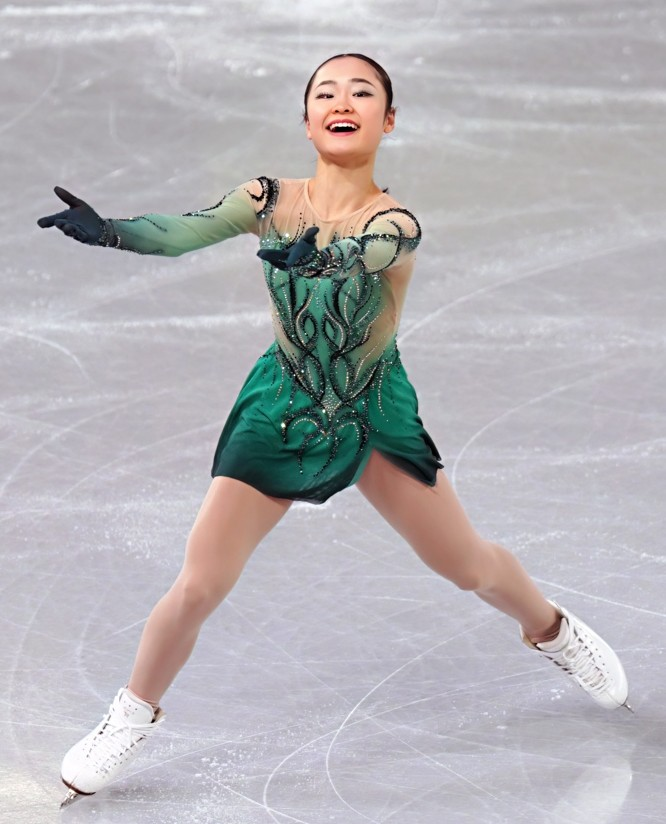
The 2026 Kinoshita Group Cup champions: Vladislav Dikidzhi of Individual Neutral Athlete (men's singles), Mao Shimada of Japan (women's singles), Aleksandra Boikova and Dmitrii Kozlovskii of Individual Neutral Athlete (pair skating), and Diana Davis and Gleb Smolkin of Georgia (ice dance)

Discipline	Gold	Silver	Bronze
Men	(Individual Neutral Athletes); Vladislav Dikidzhi	(Japan); Shun Sato	(Individual Neutral Athletes); Evgeni Semenenko
Women	(Japan); Mao Shimada	(Individual Neutral Athletes); Alexandra Ignatova	(Individual Neutral Athletes); Anna Frolova
Pairs	(Individual Neutral Athletes); Aleksandra Boikova; Dmitrii Kozlovskii	(Individual Neutral Athletes); Ekaterina Chikmareva; Matvei Ianchenkov	(Individual Neutral Athletes); Anastasia Mukhortova; Dmitry Evgenyev
Ice dance	(Georgia (country)); Diana Davis; Gleb Smolkin	(Individual Neutral Athletes); Vasilisa Kaganovskaia; Maxim Nekrasov	(Czech Republic); Natálie Taschlerová; Filip Taschler

== Results ==
=== Men's singles ===
Men's results
Rank	Skater	Nation	Total	SP		FS	
1st place, gold medalist(s)	Vladislav Dikidzhi	(Individual Neutral Athletes) Individual Neutral Athlete	265.68	2	88.79	3	176.89
2nd place, silver medalist(s)	Shun Sato	Japan	255.92	3	85.71	5	170.21
3rd place, bronze medalist(s)	Evgeni Semenenko	(Individual Neutral Athletes) Individual Neutral Athlete	253.30	6	74.41	2	178.89
4	Seo Min-kyu	South Korea	251.07	9	70.19	1	180.88
5	Rio Nakata	Japan	243.15	1	96.48	7	146.67
6	Petr Gumennik	(Individual Neutral Athletes) Individual Neutral Athlete	236.25	13	65.54	4	170.71
7	Kao Miura	Japan	233.81	11	68.44	6	165.37
8	Mark Gorodnitsky	Israel	218.67	4	76.71	8	141.96
9	Jacob Sanchez	United States	206.50	5	75.43	10	131.07
10	Donovan Carrillo	Mexico	201.79	15	62.96	9	138.83
11	Kim Hyun-gyeom	South Korea	194.86	8	73.01	12	121.85
12	Liam Kapeikis	United States	193.20	7	73.28	14	119.92
13	Lucius Kazanecki	United States	189.29	12	66.14	11	123.15
14	Lukáš Václavík	Slovakia	184.97	14	64.19	13	120.78
15	Tao MacRae	Great Britain	179.28	10	68.76	15	110.52
16	Raffaele Francesco Zich	Italy	152.16	16	55.73	16	96.43

=== Women's singles ===
Women's results
Rank	Skater	Nation	Total	SP		FS	
1st place, gold medalist(s)	Mao Shimada	Japan	231.32	2	78.84	1	152.48
2nd place, silver medalist(s)	Alexandra Ignatova	(Individual Neutral Athletes) Individual Neutral Athlete	221.06	4	74.92	2	146.14
3rd place, bronze medalist(s)	Anna Frolova	(Individual Neutral Athletes) Individual Neutral Athlete	207.86	5	73.66	3	134.20
4	Ami Nakai	Japan	207.72	1	80.27	4	127.45
5	Kamilla Neliubova	(Individual Neutral Athletes) Individual Neutral Athlete	201.34	3	76.08	6	125.26
6	Veronika Zhilina	Azerbaijan	193.00	6	66.60	5	126.40
7	Yuna Aoki	Japan	181.79	8	58.61	7	123.18
8	Kim Seo-young	South Korea	172.99	7	60.53	8	112.46
9	Alexa Gasparotto	United States	158.04	9	55.72	10	102.32
10	Youn Seo-jin	South Korea	155.78	10	52.62	9	103.16
11	Andrea Montesinos Cantú	Mexico	143.23	11	51.24	11	91.99

=== Pairs ===
Pairs' results
Rank	Team	Nation	Total points	SP		FS	
1st place, gold medalist(s)	Aleksandra Boikova; Dmitrii Kozlovskii	(Individual Neutral Athletes) Individual Neutral Athlete	203.66	2	72.25	1	131.41
2nd place, silver medalist(s)	Ekaterina Chikmareva; Matvei Ianchenkov	(Individual Neutral Athletes) Individual Neutral Athlete	202.55	1	72.30	2	130.25
3rd place, bronze medalist(s)	Anastasia Mukhortova; Dmitry Evgenyev	(Individual Neutral Athletes) Individual Neutral Athlete	189.94	3	70.81	3	119.13
4	Chelsea Liu; Ryan Bedard	United States	165.70	5	58.88	4	106.82
5	Valentina Plazas; Maximiliano Fernandez	United States	158.99	4	61.15	6	97.84
6	Camille Kovalev; Pavel Kovalev	France	151.69	6	51.74	5	99.95
7	Reagan Moss; Jakub Galbavy	United States	143.08	7	51.52	7	91.56
8	Neamh Davison; Daniel Borisov	Great Britain	115.16	8	39.11	8	76.05

=== Ice dance ===
Ice dance results
Rank	Team	Nation	Total points	RD		FD	
1st place, gold medalist(s)	Diana Davis; Gleb Smolkin	Georgia	189.99	1	79.74	2	110.25
2nd place, silver medalist(s)	Vasilisa Kaganovskaia; Maxim Nekrasov	(Individual Neutral Athletes) Individual Neutral Athlete	184.81	2	74.21	1	110.60
3rd place, bronze medalist(s)	Natálie Taschlerová; Filip Taschler	Czech Republic	176.83	3	73.79	4	103.04
4	Noemi Maria Tali; Noah Lafornara	Italy	175.43	5	71.09	3	104.34
5	Elizaveta Pasechnik; Dario Cirisano	(Individual Neutral Athletes) Individual Neutral Athlete	172.71	6	71.02	5	101.69
6	Utana Yoshida; Masaya Morita	Japan	170.49	4	71.50	6	98.99
7	Ikura Kushida; Koshiro Shimada	Japan	161.76	7	64.86	8	96.90
8	Rika Kihira; Shingo Nishiyama	Japan	156.86	8	61.37	9	95.49
9	Ekaterina Mironova; Evgenii Ustenko	(Individual Neutral Athletes) Individual Neutral Athlete	154.56	10	59.55	10	95.01
10	Ekaterina Andreeva; Dzmitryi Blinou	(Individual Neutral Athletes) Individual Neutral Athlete	154.26	9	59.61	11	94.65
11	Katarina Wolfkostin; Dimitry Tsarevski	United States	152.84	12	54.31	7	98.53
12	Kaho Yamashita; Yuto Nagata	Japan	131.83	11	55.13	12	76.70

== Works cited ==
- "Sports Rules – Single & Pair Skating and Ice Dance" (PDF). International Skating Union. Archived (PDF) from the original on 24 May 2026.
