= Veronika Zhilina =

Russian figure skater

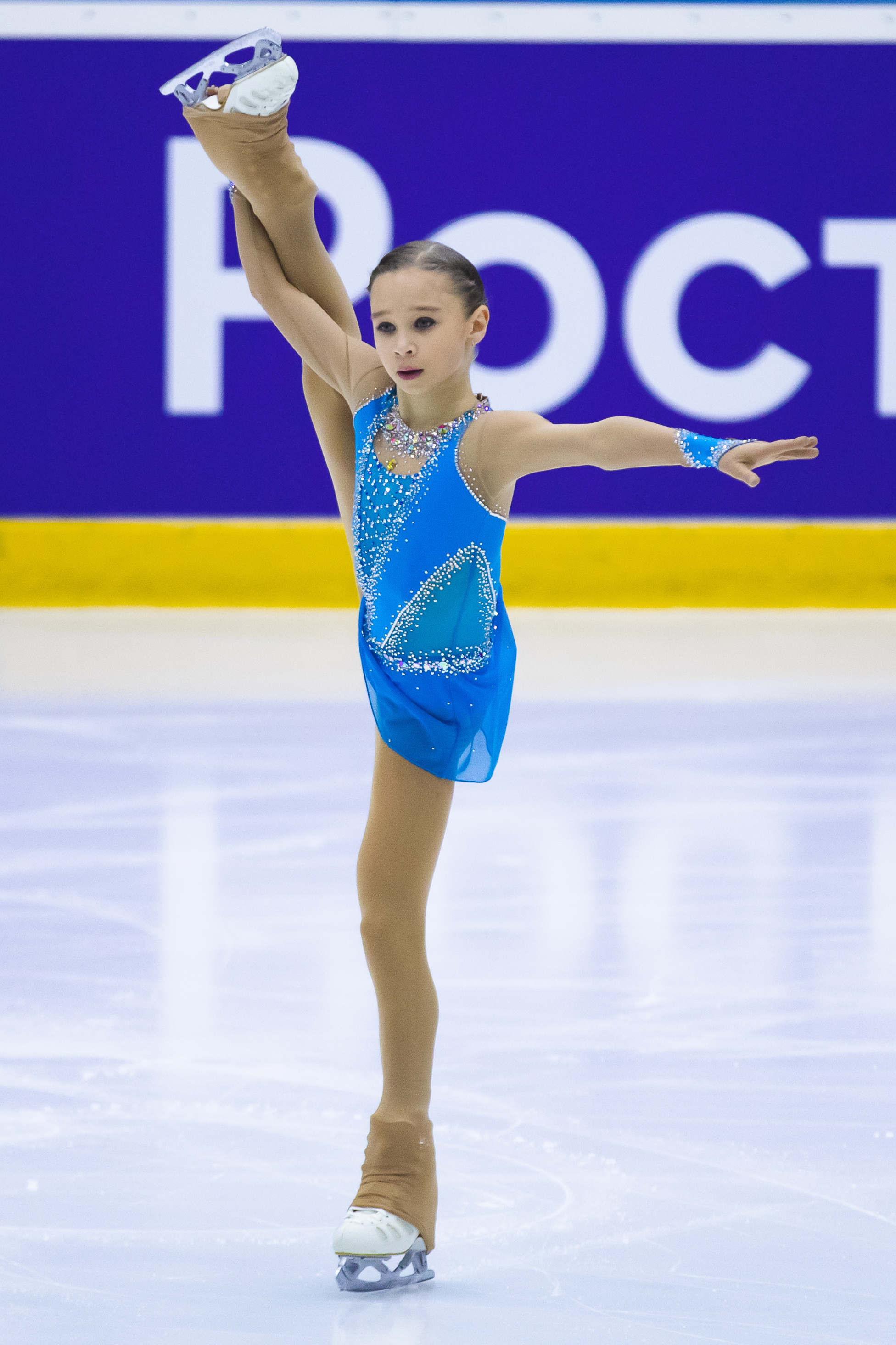
- Zhilina at the 2020 Russian Figure Skating Cup

Personal information
- Native name: Вероника Владиславовна Жилина
- Full name: Veronika Vladislavovna Zhilina
- Born: 15 May 2008 (age 18) Severodvinsk, Arkhangelsk, Russia
- Home town: Moscow, Russia
- Height: 142 cm (4 ft 8 in)

Figure skating career
- Country: Azerbaijan (since 2026); Russia (until 2023)
- Coach: Evgeni Plushenko; Ludmila Alferova
- Skating club: Academy “Angely Plushenko”
- Began skating: 2011

Veronika Vladislavovna Zhilina (Russian: Вероника Владиславовна Жилина; born 15 May 2008) is a Russian-born Azerbaijani figure skater. Skating for Russia, she is the 2021 JGP Slovakia champion, the 2023 Russian Junior Grand Prix Final champion and the 2023 Russian Junior national silver medalist.

She has performed various quadruple jumps. At the age of 10, Zhilina became the youngest skater in history to perform quad-toe loop jump during the competition. Representing native Russia, she built successful junior career, but in 2025 received Azerbaijani passport and made a decision to start representing Azerbaijan. According to Yana Rudkovskaya, the CEO of "Angely Plushenko" academy where Zhilina has been coached, the main causes of such decision were lack of financial support from Russian Figure Skating Federation, as well as long-lasting federation-imposed ban to enter Russian national competitions after being granted an Azerbaijani citizenship. Since 2026, Zhilina is a member of Azerbaijani national figure skating team, being admitted there on 2 July 2026 according to the statement of Azerbaijani Federation of Winter Sports.

== Personal life ==
Veronika Zhilina was born in Severodvinsk, Arkhangelsk, Russia on 15 May 2008. Her sister, Alena, who is two years younger, is also a figure skater.

In May 2025, Zhilina became an Azerbaijani citizen and surrendered her Russian citizenship after turning eighteen as per the country's sole citizenship law.

== Career ==
=== Skating for Russia ===
==== Early career ====
Zhilina began skating at the age of three with her mother, Ludmila Alferova, being her first coach. She initially trained at Youth Sports School “Kaskad” in Arkhangelsk before briefly relocating to Severodvinsk where she trained at Sports and Recreation Center “Zvezdochka”.

At the age of ten, Zhilina moved to Moscow and joined Eteri Tutberidze's group of skaters at Sambo-70, “Khrustalny”. In addition to Tutberidze, her other coaches included Sergei Dudakov, Sergei Rozanov, and Daniil Gleikhengauz. In June 2020, it was announced that Zhilina had transferred to Academy “Angely Plushenko” after her main coach, Sergei Rozanov, got a job there and invited Zhilina to join him. Upon transferring, Evgeni Plushenko joined her coaching team and Zhilina's mother was also hired to coach the skating academy.

==== 2020–2021 season: Junior debut ====
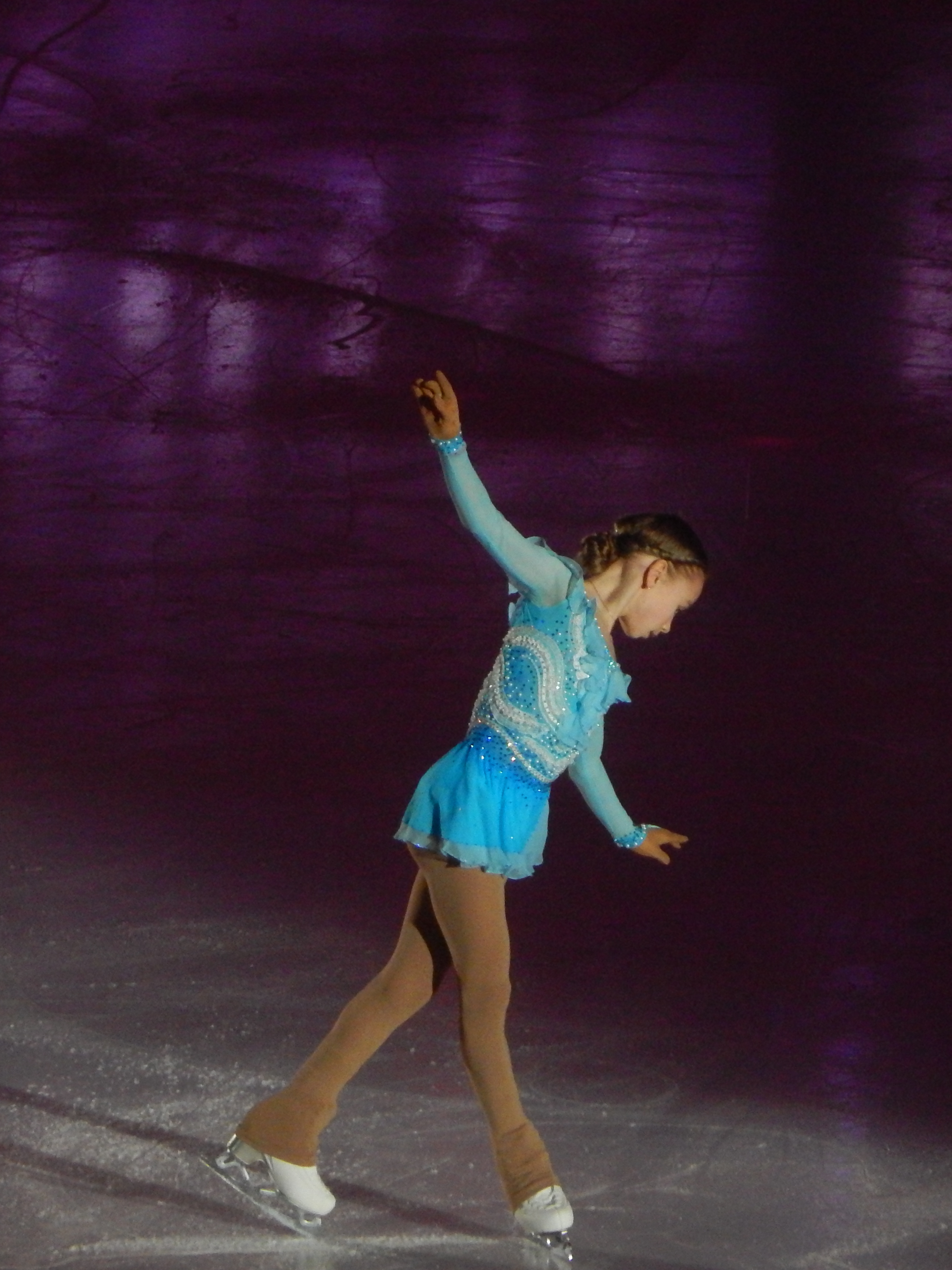
Zhilina performing at the 2020 Moscow VTB Arena Ice Show

Debuting on the junior level, Zhilina competed at 2020 Russian Cup Stage IV, Kazan and 2020 Russian Cup Stage V, Moscow, winning silver at both events.

In January, she competed at the 2021 Russian Junior Championships, finishing in twelfth place. Zhilina then concluded her season by placing eighth at the 2021 Russian Cup Final.

==== 2021–2022 season: International debut ====
Zhilina started her season in September by making her international debut on the Junior Grand Prix, winning the gold medal at 2021 JGP Slovakia ahead of teammates, Sofia Muravieva and Adeliia Petrosian. Following the event, Zhilina sprained her ankle and was forced to withdraw from 2021 JGP Poland.

In January, Zhilina competed at the 2022 Russian Junior Championships, where she placed fourth in the short program and sixteenth in the free skate to finish twelfth overall. She then finished her season with a fourth-place finish at the 2022 Russian Cup Final.

In March, the ISU banned all figure skaters and officials from Russia and Belarus from competing in international competitions due to the Russian invasion of Ukraine in late February.

==== 2022–2023 season: Russian Junior Grand Prix Final champion ====
Due to the banning of Russian skaters from competing internationally, Zhilina competed domestically throughout the season on the junior level. She started her season in the fall by winning gold at both 2022 Russian Grand Prix II, Sochi and 2022 Russian Grand Prix IV, Moscow.

In February, Zhilina won the silver medal at the 2023 Russian Junior Championships behind Alina Gorbacheva after placing ninth in the short program and winning the free skate. Zhilina then concluded her season by winning gold at the 2023 Russian Grand Prix Final.

==== 2023–2024 season: Spinal injury ====
In September, Zhilina partook in the season's Russian Test Skates, an event where Russian skaters debut their programs without being scored. However, due to a spinal injury, she subsequently withdrew from her two assigned Russian Grand Prix events following the advice of her doctors.

==== 2024–2026: Hiatus, request to represent Azerbaijan, and allegations against Sergei Rozanov ====
During the summer of 2024, Zhilina's spinal injury worsened and as a result was forced to sit out the entirety of the 2024–25 season.

In April 2025, Zhilina and her mother, Ludmila Alferova, publicly accused Zhilina's former coach, Sergei Rozanov, of sexually harassing Zhilina when she was eleven years old. "Sergei Rozanov came to my room during training camp in Kislovodsk in 2021," shared then sixteen-year old Zhilina during an interview with Match TV. "He offered and spent a long time persuading me to give him a massage, but I refused, as I was the only one in the room at the time. The same thing happened in the gym, also in Kislovodsk, after the warm-up, where he insisted on it even after all the athletes and coaches had left the gym. He came with a can of beer and coached me in the room." Rozanov vehemently denied the allegations, saying, "Everything said about me is an absolute lie."

Yana Rudkovskaya, the wife of Evgeni Plushenko, who had allegedly learned of Zhilina's allegations at the time of his departure from the academy 2021, wrote a lengthy response to Rozanov's comment, saying, "I advise you to think twice before giving such interviews regarding the 'lies' about you told by the underage athletes you worked with before our eyes. You humiliated, insulted, and beat countless children with blankets before you came to our academy. And everyone believed you'd changed your approach to athletes! But that doesn't mean you've been forgiven for your past achievements. We've already had more than ten such cases in three days, and those are just the ones that were reported to me personally." The International Skating Union (ISU) also commented on the allegations saying, "The International Skating Union (ISU) is deeply concerned by the recent allegations made by Russian figure skater Veronika Zhilina regarding alleged misconduct by her coach, Sergei Rozanov. The ISU takes all allegations of harassment, abuse, or inappropriate behavior extremely seriously. If the allegations are confirmed, the ISU will take all appropriate disciplinary measures in accordance with the ISU's rules and in coordination with the national federations concerned. In light of these allegations, the ISU approaches the matter with a firm commitment to confidentiality and respect for the wishes and well-being of the skater."

In May 2025, Zhilina announced via Instagram that she had undergone spinal surgery and shared that she had received an Azerbaijani passport with plans to start representing the county. In July of that year, the ISU and Russian Figure Skating Federation denied her transfer, citing her continued status as a Russian national team member. CEO of the Russian Figure Skating Federation, Aleksandr Kogan, publicly announced that the federation would be willing to help Zhilina if she decided to continue representing Russia. Head of the Russian Figure Skating Federation, Anton Sikharulidze, stated that Zhilina's denied transfer was due to her failing to inform the Ministry of Internal Affairs within sixty days of obtaining her Azerbaijani citizenship.

=== Skating for Azerbaijan ===
==== 2026–2027 season ====
In May 2026, the Figure Skating Federation of Russia released Zhilina and the International Skating Union approved her request transfer to the Azerbaijani national team.

Zhilina made her international debut for Azerbaijan at the 2026 Kinoshita Group Cup; placing 6th overall. "I'm happy that I'm performing here, I'm finally competing this season after missing three years!" She later went onto finish sixth at the 2026 CS Denis Ten Memorial.

== Media ==
Zhilina featured in the Russian movie, "Lyod 3" (also known as Ice 3) where she portrayed the character of Albina; a figure skater who serves as a rival to the main heroine in the romantic sports drama.

=== Film ===
| Year | Title | Role | Ref. |
|---|---|---|---|
| 2024 | "Lyod 3" | Albina | |

== Programs ==
| Season | Short program | Free skating |
|---|---|---|
| 2026–2027 | Poker Face; Abracadabra by Lady Gaga choreo. by Anastasia Skoptsova and Maria Stavitskaya | Demain dès l'aube by Élie Semoun; Voices; Spirits by Chronis Taxidis choreo. by Andrei Ezhlov |
| 2024-2026 | Did not compete these seasons | |
| 2023–2024 | Can't Help Falling in Love (DARK) performed by Tommee Profitt & Brooke; Can't Help Falling in Love performed by Diana Ankudinova choreo. by Dmitry Mikhailov | Earth Song; In The Closet; Dangerous; Smooth Criminal by Michael Jackson choreo. by Dmitry Mikhailov |
| 2022–2023 | Swan (Lake Forest and Birds) by Camille Saint-Saëns performed by Nederica Stepan; Perfection (from Black Swan) by Clint Mansell choreo. by Vladimir Mogilda; Je t'aime by Lara Fabian performed by Sevara Nazarkhan choreo. by Elena Radionova | El Tango de Roxanne (from Moulin Rouge!) performed by Anna Dereszowska & Machina Del Tango choreo. by Elena Radionova |
| 2021–2022 | Harley Quinn; You Don't Own Me by Lesley Gore performed by Uptown Fun Kids; Seven Nation Army by The White Stripes choreo. by Maria Stavitskaya | Love Story by Francis Lai performed by Lola & Hauser choreo. by Maria Stavitskaya |
| 2020–2021 | Sweet Dreams (Are Made of This) (from Sucker Punch) performed by Emily Browning; Smoke on the Water by Deep Purple performed by 2WEI | Samson and Delilah by Camille Saint-Saëns; Act III, Scene 2: Bacchanale performed by Arthur Fiedler & Boston Pops Orchestra; Mon cœur s'ouvre à ta voix performed by Andre Kostelanetz & New York Philharmonic |
| 2019–2020 | Once Upon a December (from Anastasia) performed by Liz Callaway choreo. by Daniil Gleikhengauz | Elastic Heart (Piano Version); Chandelier by Sia choreo. by Daniil Gleikhengauz |
| 2018–2019 | Once Upon a December (from Anastasia) performed by Liz Callaway choreo. by Daniil Gleikhengauz | Chandelier by Sia choreo. by Daniil Gleikhengauz |
| 2017–2018 | The Swan by Camille Saint-Saëns performed by Jascha Silberstein & Marie Goossens | The Drill by Ariiel de Jones; They Don't Care About Us; Smooth Criminal by Michael Jackson |

== Competitive highlights ==
- JGP – Event of the ISU Junior Grand Prix Series
- CS – Event of the ISU Challenger Series
- TBD – Assigned

=== Skating for Azerbaijan ===
Competition placements at senior level
| Season | 2026–27 |
|---|---|
| CS Denis Ten Memorial | 6th |
| CS Kinoshita Group Cup | 6th |

=== Skating for Russia ===
Competition placements at junior level
| Season | 2020–21 | 2021–22 | 2022–23 |
|---|---|---|---|
| Russian Championships | 12th | 12th | 2nd |
| Russian Grand Prix Final (Note: The 2023 Russian Cup Final was renamed as the 2023 Russian Grand Prix Final.) | 8th | 4th | 1st |
| Russian GP Stage 2 (Note: In 2022, the Russian Cup Stages were renamed to Russian Grand Prix Stages.) | | | 1st |
| Russian GP Stage 4 | 2nd | | 1st |
| Russian GP Stage 5 | 2nd | | |
| JGP Slovakia | | 1st | |

== Detailed results ==
ISU personal best scores in the +5/-5 GOE System
| Segment | Type | Score | Event |
|---|---|---|---|
| Total | TSS | 216.92 | 2021 JGP Slovakia |
| Short program | TSS | 71.57 | 2021 JGP Slovakia |
| Short program | TES | 40.51 | 2021 JGP Slovakia |
| Short program | PCS | 31.06 | 2021 JGP Slovakia |
| Free skating | TSS | 145.35 | 2021 JGP Slovakia |
| Free skating | TES | 83.43 | 2021 JGP Slovakia |
| Free skating | PCS | 62.92 | 2021 JGP Slovakia |

=== Skating for Azerbaijan ===
Results in the 2026–27 season
| Date | Event | SP | | FS | | Total | |
| Date | Event | P | Score | P | Score | P | Score |
|---|---|---|---|---|---|---|---|
| Sept 4–6, 2026 | (Japan) 2026 Kinoshita Group Cup | 6 | 66.60 | 5 | 126.40 | 6 | 193.00 |
| Oct 8–11, 2026 | (Kazakhstan) 2026 CS Denis Ten Memorial Challenge | 7 | 60.65 | 6 | 125.68 | 6 | 186.33 |

=== Skating for Russia ===
Results in the 2020–21 season
| Date | Event | SP | | FS | | Total | |
| Date | Event | P | Score | P | Score | P | Score |
|---|---|---|---|---|---|---|---|
| 8–12 Nov 2020 | (Russia) 2020 Russian Cup Stage IV, Kazan | 2 | 71.05 | 3 | 126.40 | 2 | 197.45 |
| 5–8 Dec 2020 | (Russia) 2020 Russian Cup Stage V, Moscow | 2 | 77.28 | 4 | 118.36 | 2 | 195.64 |
| 2–5 Jan 2021 | (Russia) 2021 Russian Junior Championships | 14 | 58.91 | 11 | 121.88 | 12 | 180.79 |
| 26 Feb – 2 March 2021 | (Russia) 2021 Russian Cup Final | 12 | 53.18 | 4 | 131.57 | 8 | 184.75 |

Results in the 2021–22 season
| Date | Event | SP | | FS | | Total | |
| Date | Event | P | Score | P | Score | P | Score |
|---|---|---|---|---|---|---|---|
| 1–4 Sep 2021 | 2021 JGP Slovakia | 2 | 71.57 | 1 | 145.35 | 1 | 216.92 |
| 18–22 Jan 2022 | (Russia) 2022 Russian Junior Championships | 4 | 69.91 | 16 | 111.07 | 12 | 180.98 |
| 26 Feb – 2 March 2022 | (Russia) 2022 Russian Cup Final | 10 | 59.74 | 3 | 136.34 | 4 | 196.08 |

Results in the 2022–23 season
| Date | Event | SP | | FS | | Total | |
| Date | Event | P | Score | P | Score | P | Score |
|---|---|---|---|---|---|---|---|
| 26–28 Oct 2022 | (Russia) 2022 Russian Grand Prix II, Sochi | 1 | 76.67 | 1 | 156.51 | 1 | 233.18 |
| 8–11 Nov 2022 | (Russia) 2022 Russian Grand Prix IV, Moscow | 1 | 78.71 | 1 | 142.43 | 1 | 221.14 |
| 14–18 Feb 2022 | (Russia) 2023 Russian Junior Championships | 9 | 66.94 | 1 | 151.85 | 2 | 218.79 |
| 1–3 Mar 2023 | (Russia) 2023 Russian Grand Prix Final | 2 | 71.75 | 1 | 150.70 | 1 | 222.45 |
