= 2026 CS Denis Ten Memorial Challenge =

Figure skating competition

- Type: ISU Challenger Series
- Date: 7 – 11 October 2026
- Season: 2026–27
- Location: Almaty, Kazakhstan
- Host: Denis Ten Foundation & Kazakhstan Skating Union
- Venue: Halyk Arena

Champions
- Men's singles: (Individual Neutral Athletes) Vladislav Dikidzhi
- Women's singles: (Individual Neutral Athletes) Alexandra Ignatova
- Ice dance: (Finland) Juulia Turkkila and Matthias Versluis
- Previous: 2025 CS Denis Ten Memorial Challenge
- Next: 2027 CS Denis Ten Memorial Challenge
- Previous CS: 2026 CS Trialeti Trophy
- Next CS: 2026 CS Budapest Trophy

The 2026 Denis Ten Memorial Challenge is a figure skating competition sanctioned by the International Skating Union (ISU), organized and hosted by the Denis Ten Foundation and the Kazakhstan Skating Union, and the eighth event of the 2026–27 ISU Challenger Series. It will be held at the Halyk Arena in Almaty, Kazakhstan, from 7 to 11 October 2026. Medals will be awarded in men's singles, women's singles, and ice dance, and skaters will earn ISU World Standing points based on their results. Vladislav Dikidzhi of an Individual Neutral Athlete, won the men's event; Alexandra Ignatova of an Individual Neutral Athlete, won the women's event; Juulia Turkkila and Matthias Versluis of Finland won the ice dance event.

== Background ==
The inaugural edition of the Denis Ten Memorial Challenge was held in 2019 in Almaty. The competition is named in honor of Denis Ten, a former figure skater who competed internationally for Kazakhstan. He was the 2014 Winter Olympic bronze medalist, a two-time World Championship medalist, and the 2015 Four Continents champion. Ten was murdered on 19 July 2018 in Almaty by carjackers. The 2026 Denis Ten Memorial Challenge took place from 7 to 11 October at the Halyk Arena in Almaty.

The ISU Challenger Series was introduced in 2014. It is a series of international figure skating competitions sanctioned by the International Skating Union (ISU) and organized by ISU member nations. The objective was to ensure consistent organization and structure within a series of international competitions linked together, providing opportunities for senior-level skaters to compete at the international level and also earn ISU World Standing points. The 2026–27 Challenger Series consisted of thirteen events, of which the Denis Ten Memorial Challenge was the eighth.

== Changes in preliminary assignments ==
The International Skating Union published the preliminary list of entrants on 18 September 2026.

| Date | Discipline | Withdrew | Added | Ref. |
|---|---|---|---|---|
| 6 October | Women | (Individual Neutral Athletes); Alina Gorbacheva | (Individual Neutral Athletes); Dina Khusnutdinova | |
| 6 October | Women | (Germany); Valentina Andrianova | —N/a | |
| 6 October | Women | (Kyrgyzstan); Zhasmin Shlaga | —N/a | |
| 6 October | Women | (Kyrgyzstan); Daria Snegovskaia | —N/a | |
| 6 October | Women | —N/a | (Armenia); Mariia Arutiunian | |
| 7 October | Men | (Chinese Taipei); Li Yu-Hsiang | —N/a | |
| 7 October | Ice dance | (Kazakhstan); Gaukhar Nauryzova; Boyisangur Datiev | —N/a | |

== Required performance elements ==
=== Single skating ===
Men and women competing in single skating first perform their short programs on 8 October. Lasting no more than 2 minutes 40 seconds, the short program has to include the following elements:

For men: one double or triple Axel; one triple or quadruple jump; one jump combination consisting of a double jump and a triple jump, two triple jumps, or a quadruple jump and a double jump or triple jump; one flying spin; one camel spin or sit spin with a change of foot; one spin combination with a change of foot; and one step sequence using the full ice surface.

For women: one double or triple Axel; one triple jump; one jump combination consisting of a double jump and a triple jump, or two triple jumps; one flying spin; one layback spin, sideways leaning spin, camel spin, or sit spin without a change of foot; one spin combination with a change of foot; and one step sequence using the full ice surface.

Men perform their free skates on 10 October, while women perform theirs on 9 October. The free skate can last no more than 4 minutes, and has to include the following: six jump elements, of which one has to be an Axel-type jump; three spins, of which one has to be a spin combination, one a flying spin, and one a choreographic spin; one step sequence; and a choreographic sequence.

=== Ice dance ===
Couples competing in ice dance first perform their rhythm dances on 9 October. Lasting no more than 2 minutes 50 seconds, the theme of the rhythm dance this season is "Rhythm and Waltz". The rhythm dance has to include the following elements: one section of the Golden Waltz pattern dance, one creative dance element, one dance lift, one set of sequential twizzles, and one step sequence while not touching.

Couples then perform their free dances on 10 October. The free dance can last no longer than 4 minutes, and has to include the following: three dance lifts or one short lift and one combination lift; one dance spin; one step sequence in hold; one set of synchronized twizzles, one one-foot turns sequence in hold, and two choreographic elements.

== Judging ==
Skaters are judged according to the required technical elements of their program (such as jumps and spins), as well as the overall presentation of their program, based on three program components (skating skills, presentation, and composition). Each technical element in a figure skating performance is assigned a predetermined base point value and scored by a panel of nine judges on a scale from −5 to +5 based on the quality of its execution. Each Grade of Execution (GOE) from –5 to +5 is assigned a value as indicated on the Scale of Values. For example, a triple Axel is worth a base value of 8.00 points, and a GOE of +3 is worth 2.40 points, so a triple Axel with a GOE of +3 earns 10.40 points. The judging panel's GOE for each element is determined by calculating the trimmed mean (the average after discarding the highest and lowest scores). The panel's scores for all elements are added together to generate a Total Elements Score. At the same time, the judges evaluate each performance based on the five aforementioned program components and assign each a score from 0.25 to 10 in 0.25-point increments. The judging panel's final score for each program component is also determined by calculating the trimmed mean. Those scores are then multiplied by the factor shown on the chart below; the results are added together to generate a total Program Component Score.

Program component factoring
| Discipline | Short program or rhythm dance | Free skate or free dance |
|---|---|---|
| Men | 1.67 | 3.33 |
| Women | 1.33 | 2.67 |
| Ice dance | 1.33 | 2.00 |

Deductions are applied for certain violations, such as time infractions, stops and restarts, or falls. The Total Elements Score and Program Component Score are then added together, minus any deductions, to generate a final performance score for each skater or team.

== Medal summary ==
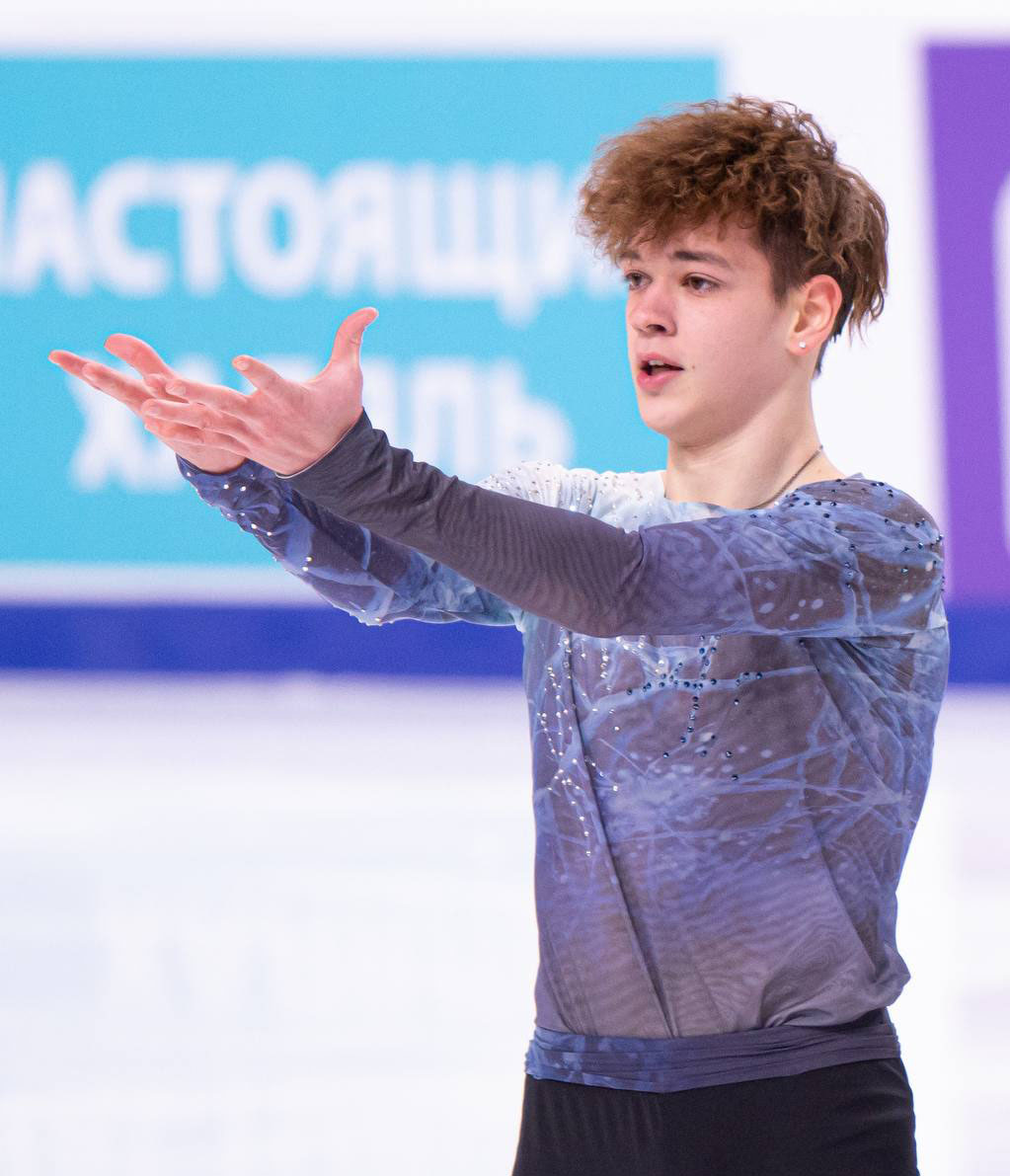
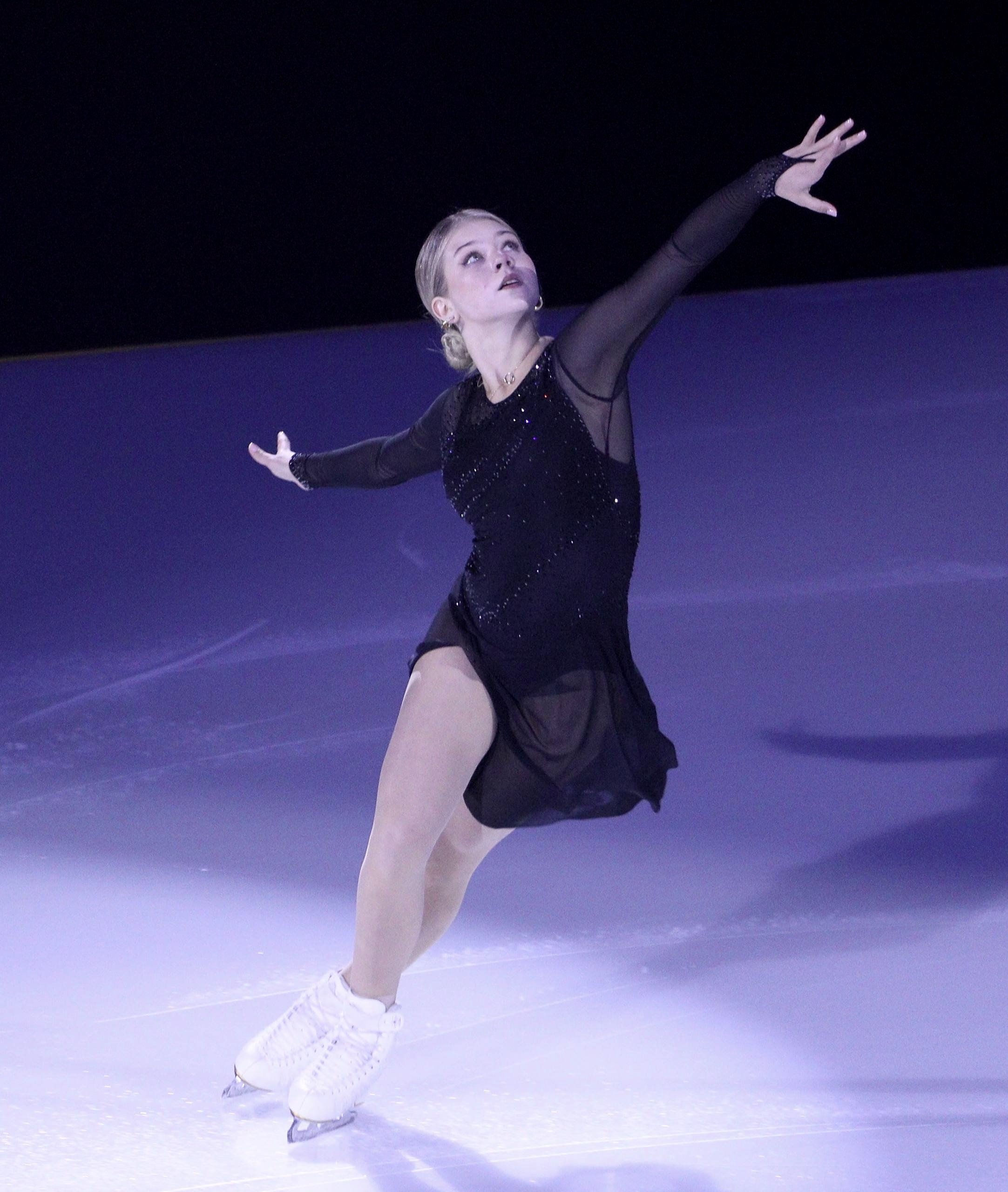
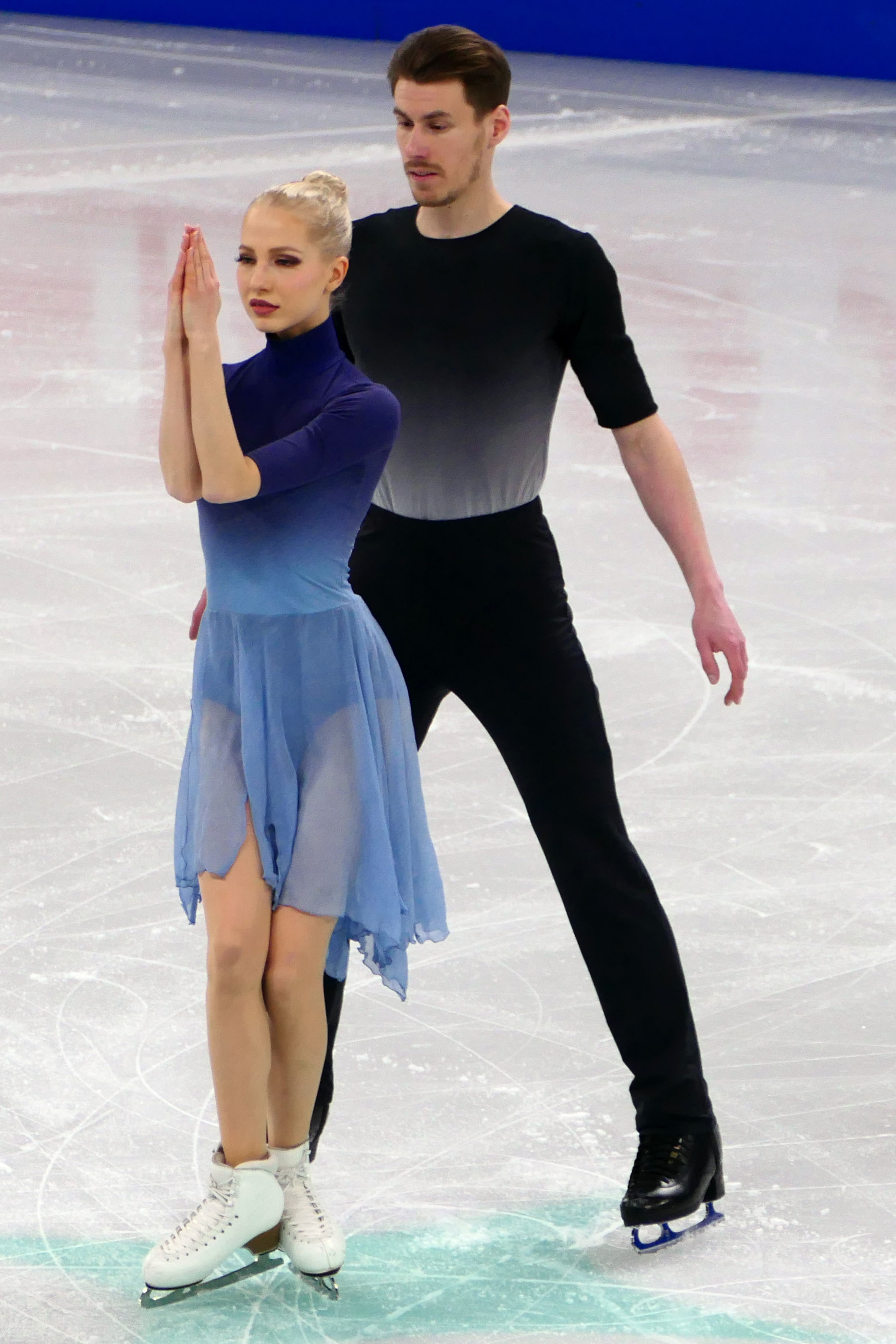
The 2026 Denis Ten Memorial Challenge champions (from left to right): Vladislav Dikidzhi of Individual Neutral Athlete (men's singles); Alexandra Ignatova of Individual Neutral Athlete (women's singles); and Juulia Turkkila and Matthias Versluis of Finland (ice dance)

Medalists
| Discipline | Gold | Silver | Bronze |
|---|---|---|---|
| Men | (Individual Neutral Athletes); Vladislav Dikidzhi | (Individual Neutral Athletes); Gleb Lutfullin | (Individual Neutral Athletes); Petr Gumennik |
| Women | (Individual Neutral Athletes); Alexandra Ignatova | (South Korea); Kim Yu-jae | (Kazakhstan); Sofia Samodelkina |
| Ice dance | (Finland); Juulia Turkkila; Matthias Versluis | (Individual Neutral Athletes); Vasilisa Kaganovskaia; Maxim Nekrasov | (United States); Caroline Green; Michael Parsons |

== Results ==
=== Men's singles ===
Men's results
| Rank | Skater | Nation | Total points | SP | | FS | |
|---|---|---|---|---|---|---|---|
| 1 | Vladislav Dikidzhi | (Individual Neutral Athletes) Individual Neutral Athlete | 312.79 | 1 | 107.31 | 1 | 205.48 |
| 2 | Gleb Lutfullin | (Individual Neutral Athletes) Individual Neutral Athlete | 277.23 | 2 | 95.79 | 2 | 181.44 |
| 3 | Petr Gumennik | (Individual Neutral Athletes) Individual Neutral Athlete | 261.76 | 3 | 80.63 | 3 | 181.13 |
| 4 | Daniel Martynov | United States | 221.55 | 5 | 77.36 | 4 | 144.19 |
| 5 | Vasil Barakhouski | (Individual Neutral Athletes) Individual Neutral Athlete | 218.36 | 4 | 77.96 | 5 | 140.40 |
| 6 | Chen Yudong | China | 196.60 | 8 | 64.19 | 6 | 132.41 |
| 7 | Alex Labovich | (Individual Neutral Athletes) Individual Neutral Athlete | 189.37 | 9 | 61.26 | 7 | 128.11 |
| 8 | Heorhi Kazlouski | (Individual Neutral Athletes) Individual Neutral Athlete | 187.70 | 6 | 75.09 | 10 | 112.61 |
| 9 | Dias Jirenbayev | Kazakhstan | 186.27 | 7 | 66.11 | 9 | 120.16 |
| 10 | Douglas Gerber | Australia | 181.39 | 10 | 60.70 | 8 | 120.69 |

=== Women's singles ===
Women's results
| Rank | Skater | Nation | Total points | SP | | FS | |
|---|---|---|---|---|---|---|---|
| 1 | Alexandra Ignatova | (Individual Neutral Athletes) Individual Neutral Athlete | 226.01 | 1 | 77.39 | 1 | 148.62 |
| 2 | Kim Yu-jae | South Korea | 209.20 | 2 | 75.99 | 3 | 133.21 |
| 3 | Sofia Samodelkina | Kazakhstan | 204.36 | 3 | 69.45 | 2 | 134.91 |
| 4 | Viktoriia Safonova | (Individual Neutral Athletes) Individual Neutral Athlete | 198.80 | 4 | 68.42 | 4 | 130.38 |
| 5 | Mariia Zakharova | (Individual Neutral Athletes) Individual Neutral Athlete | 187.77 | 8 | 58.29 | 5 | 129.48 |
| 6 | Veronika Zhilina | Azerbaijan | 186.33 | 7 | 60.65 | 6 | 125.68 |
| 7 | Dina Khusnutdinova | (Individual Neutral Athletes) Individual Neutral Athlete | 185.70 | 5 | 63.09 | 7 | 122.61 |
| 8 | Phattaratida Kaneshige | Thailand | 161.05 | 9 | 56.83 | 8 | 104.22 |
| 9 | Zhu Yi | China | 157.14 | 10 | 56.75 | 9 | 100.39 |
| 10 | Zhang Ruiyang | China | 155.40 | 6 | 61.09 | 10 | 94.31 |
| 11 | Mariia Arutiunian | Armenia | 134.31 | 12 | 46.13 | 11 | 88.18 |
| 12 | Sienna Kaczmarczyk | Australia | 131.16 | 15 | 44.32 | 12 | 86.84 |
| 13 | Markéta Šukupová | Czech Republic | 124.98 | 11 | 47.08 | 13 | 77.90 |
| 14 | Nuriya Suleimen | Kazakhstan | 122.40 | 13 | 44.88 | 14 | 77.52 |
| 15 | Alika Khalimova | Kazakhstan | 120.56 | 14 | 44.68 | 15 | 75.88 |
| 16 | Amira Irmatova | Kazakhstan | 117.00 | 16 | 42.03 | 16 | 74.97 |
| 17 | Michelle Edgina Axille | Indonesia | 109.37 | 18 | 39.61 | 17 | 69.76 |
| 18 | Zere Sarbalina | Kazakhstan | 108.73 | 17 | 41.92 | 18 | 66.81 |
| 19 | Amina Alexeyeva | Kazakhstan | 98.20 | 19 | 32.68 | 19 | 65.52 |

=== Ice dance ===
Ice dance results
| Rank | Team | Nation | Total points | RD | | FD | |
|---|---|---|---|---|---|---|---|
| 1 | Juulia Turkkila; Matthias Versluis | Finland | 191.32 | 2 | 74.33 | 1 | 116.99 |
| 2 | Vasilisa Kaganovskaia; Maxim Nekrasov | (Individual Neutral Athletes) Individual Neutral Athlete | 187.20 | 3 | 74.28 | 2 | 112.92 |
| 3 | Caroline Green; Michael Parsons | United States | 180.37 | 1 | 78.64 | 4 | 101.73 |
| 4 | Irina Khavronina; Devid Naryzhnyy | (Individual Neutral Athletes) Individual Neutral Athlete | 179.04 | 4 | 73.78 | 3 | 105.26 |
| 5 | Ekaterina Andreeva; Dzmitryi Blinou | (Individual Neutral Athletes) Individual Neutral Athlete | 170.21 | 5 | 69.49 | 6 | 100.72 |
| 6 | Anna M. Shcherbakova; Egor Goncharov | (Individual Neutral Athletes) Individual Neutral Athlete | 169.77 | 6 | 68.04 | 5 | 101.73 |
| 7 | Elliana Peal; Ethan Peal | United States | 151.38 | 7 | 62.16 | 8 | 89.22 |
| 8 | Ren Junfei; Xing Jianing | China | 150.85 | 9 | 58.73 | 7 | 92.12 |
| 9 | Isabella Flores; Linus Colmor Jepsen | United States | 149.68 | 8 | 60.76 | 9 | 88.92 |
| 10 | Olivia Josephine Shilling; Leo Baeten | Belgium | 129.86 | 10 | 56.05 | 10 | 73.81 |
| 11 | Viktoryia Plaskonnaya; Uladzislau Sytsik | (Individual Neutral Athletes) Individual Neutral Athlete | 102.75 | 11 | 45.75 | 11 | 57.00 |

== Works cited ==
- "Sports Rules – Single & Pair Skating and Ice Dance" (PDF). International Skating Union. Archived (PDF) from the original on 24 May 2026.
