= 2026 CS Trialeti Trophy =

Figure skating competition in Georgia

- Type: ISU Challenger Series
- Date: 30 September – 3 October
- Season: 2026–27
- Location: Batumi, Georgia
- Host: Georgian Figure Skating Federation
- Venue: Batumi Ice Arena

Champions
- Men's singles: (Georgia (country)) Nika Egadze
- Women's singles: (Estonia) Niina Petrõkina
- Pairs: (Georgia (country)) Anastasiia Metelkina and Luka Berulava
- Ice dance: (Georgia (country)) Diana Davis and Gleb Smolkin
- Previous CS: 2026 CS Nepela Memorial
- Next CS: 2026 CS Denis Ten Memorial Challenge

The 2026 Trialeti Trophy is a figure skating competition sanctioned by the International Skating Union (ISU), organized and hosted by the Georgian Figure Skating Federation, and the seventh event of the 2026–27 ISU Challenger Series. It was held at the Batumi Ice Arena in Batumi, Georgia, from 30 September to 3 October 2026. Medals were awarded in men's singles, women's singles, pair skating, and ice dance, and skaters earned ISU World Standing points based on their results. Nika Egadze of Georgia won the men's event, Niina Petrõkina of Estonia won the women's event, Anastasia Metelkina and Luka Berulava of Georgia won the pairs event, and Diana Davis and Gleb Smolkin of Georgia won the ice dance event.

== Background ==
The ISU Challenger Series was introduced in 2014. It is a series of international figure skating competitions sanctioned by the International Skating Union (ISU) and organized by ISU member nations. The objective was to ensure consistent organization and structure within a series of international competitions linked together, providing opportunities for senior-level skaters to compete at the international level and also earn ISU World Standing points. The 2026–27 Challenger Series consists of thirteen events, of which the Trialeti Trophy was the seventh.

== Changes to preliminary assignments ==
The International Skating Union published the preliminary list of entrants on 16 September 2026.

Date	Discipline	Withdrew	Added	Ref.
30 September	Ice dance	(France); Célina Fradji; Jean-Hans Fourneaux	—N/a	
30 September	Ice dance	(Individual Neutral Athletes); Varvara Zhdanova; Timur Babaev-Smirnov	(Individual Neutral Athletes); Ekaterina Rybakova; Ivan Makhnonosov	
30 September	Men	(Individual Neutral Athletes); Andrei Mozalev	(Individual Neutral Athletes); Matvei Vetlugin	
1 October	Ice dance	(Italy); Denisa Cimlova; Stefano Frasca	—N/a	

== Required performance elements ==
=== Single skating ===
Men and women competing in single skating first perform their short programs on 1 October. Lasting no more than 2 minutes 40 seconds, the short program has to include the following elements:

For men: one double or triple Axel; one triple or quadruple jump; one jump combination consisting of a double jump and a triple jump, two triple jumps, or a quadruple jump and a double jump or triple jump; one flying spin; one camel spin or sit spin with a change of foot; one spin combination with a change of foot; and one step sequence using the full ice surface.

For women: one double or triple Axel; one triple jump; one jump combination consisting of a double jump and a triple jump, or two triple jumps; one flying spin; one layback spin, sideways leaning spin, camel spin, or sit spin without a change of foot; one spin combination with a change of foot; and one step sequence using the full ice surface.

Men perform their free skates on 2 October, while women perform theirs on 3 October. The free skate can last no more than 4 minutes, and has to include the following: six jump elements, of which one has to be an Axel-type jump; three spins, of which one has to be a spin combination, one a flying spin, and one a choreographic spin; one step sequence; and a choreographic sequence.

=== Pair skating ===
Couples competing in pair skating first perform their short programs on 2 October. Lasting no more than 2 minutes 40 seconds, the short program has to include the following elements: one pair lift, one double or triple twist lift, one double or triple throw jump, one double or triple solo jump, one pair spin combination, one death spiral, and one step sequence using the full ice surface.

Couples then perform their free skates on 3 October. The free skate can last no more than 4 minutes, and has to include the following: two pair lifts, one twist lift, two different throw jumps, one solo jump, one jump combination or sequence, one choreographic pair spin, one choreographic pair lift and one death spiral.

=== Ice dance ===
Couples competing in ice dance first perform their rhythm dances on 1 October. Lasting no more than 2 minutes 50 seconds, the theme of the rhythm dance this season is "Rhythm and Waltz". The rhythm dance has to include the following elements: one section of the Golden Waltz pattern dance, one creative dance element, one dance lift, one set of sequential twizzles, and one step sequence while not touching.

Couples then perform their free dances on 2 October. The free dance can last no longer than 4 minutes, and has to include the following: three dance lifts or one short lift and one combination lift; one dance spin; one step sequence in hold; one set of synchronized twizzles, one one-foot turns sequence in hold, and two choreographic elements.

== Judging ==
Skaters are judged according to the required technical elements of their program (such as jumps and spins), as well as the overall presentation of their program, based on three program components (skating skills, presentation, and composition). Each technical element in a figure skating performance is assigned a predetermined base point value and scored by a panel of nine judges on a scale from −5 to +5 based on the quality of its execution. Each Grade of Execution (GOE) from –5 to +5 is assigned a value as indicated on the Scale of Values. For example, a triple Axel is worth a base value of 8.00 points, and a GOE of +3 is worth 2.40 points, so a triple Axel with a GOE of +3 earns 10.40 points. The judging panel's GOE for each element is determined by calculating the trimmed mean (the average after discarding the highest and lowest scores). The panel's scores for all elements are added together to generate a Total Elements Score. At the same time, the judges evaluate each performance based on the five aforementioned program components and assign each a score from 0.25 to 10 in 0.25-point increments. The judging panel's final score for each program component is also determined by calculating the trimmed mean. Those scores are then multiplied by the factor shown on the chart below; the results are added together to generate a total Program Component Score.

Program component factoring
Discipline	Short program or rhythm dance	Free skate or free dance
Men	1.67	3.33
Women	1.33	2.67
Pairs	1.33	2.67
Ice dance	1.33	2.00

Deductions are applied for certain violations, such as time infractions, stops and restarts, or falls. The Total Elements Score and Program Component Score are then added together, minus any deductions, to generate a final performance score for each skater or team.

== Medal summary ==
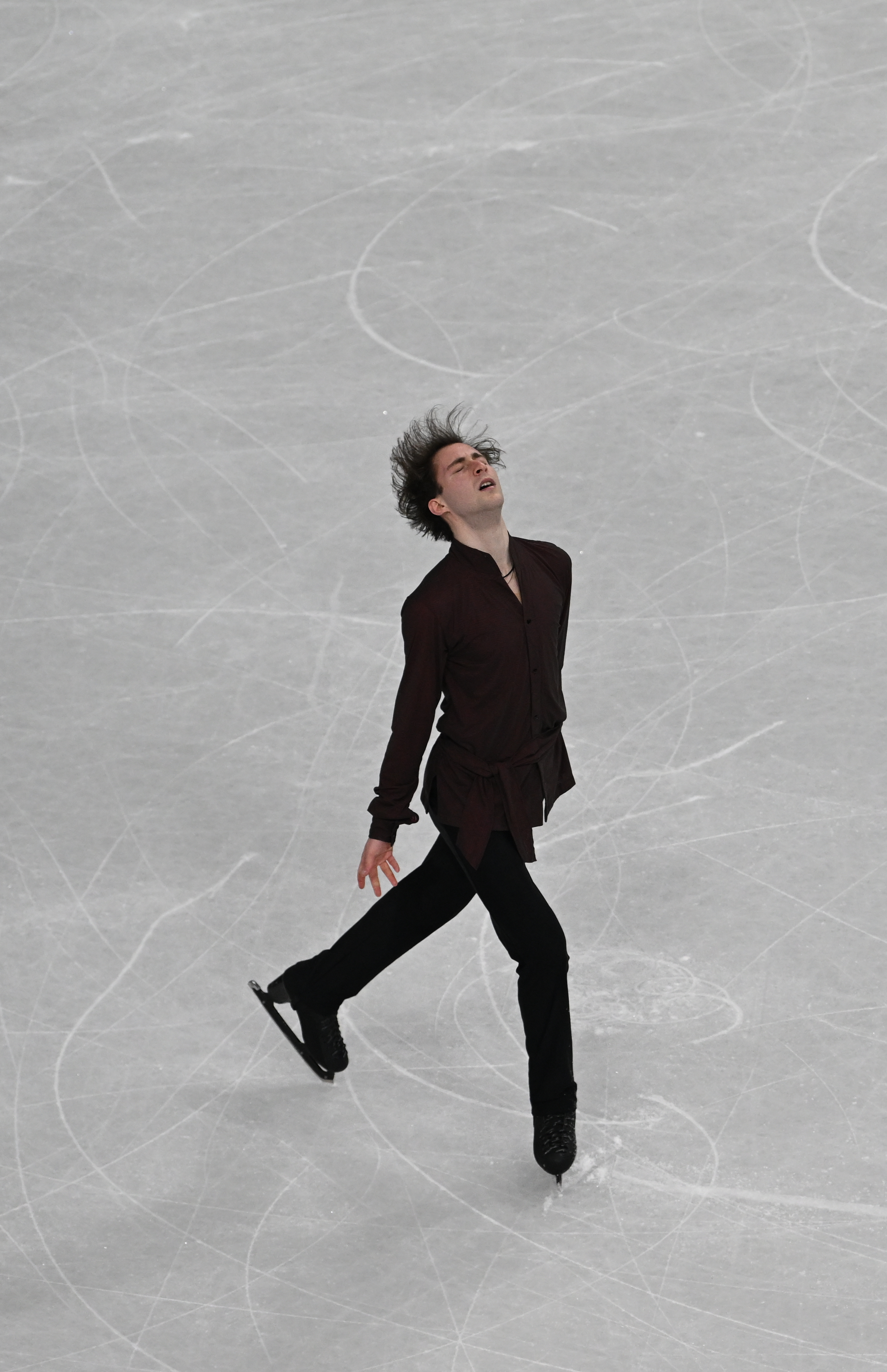
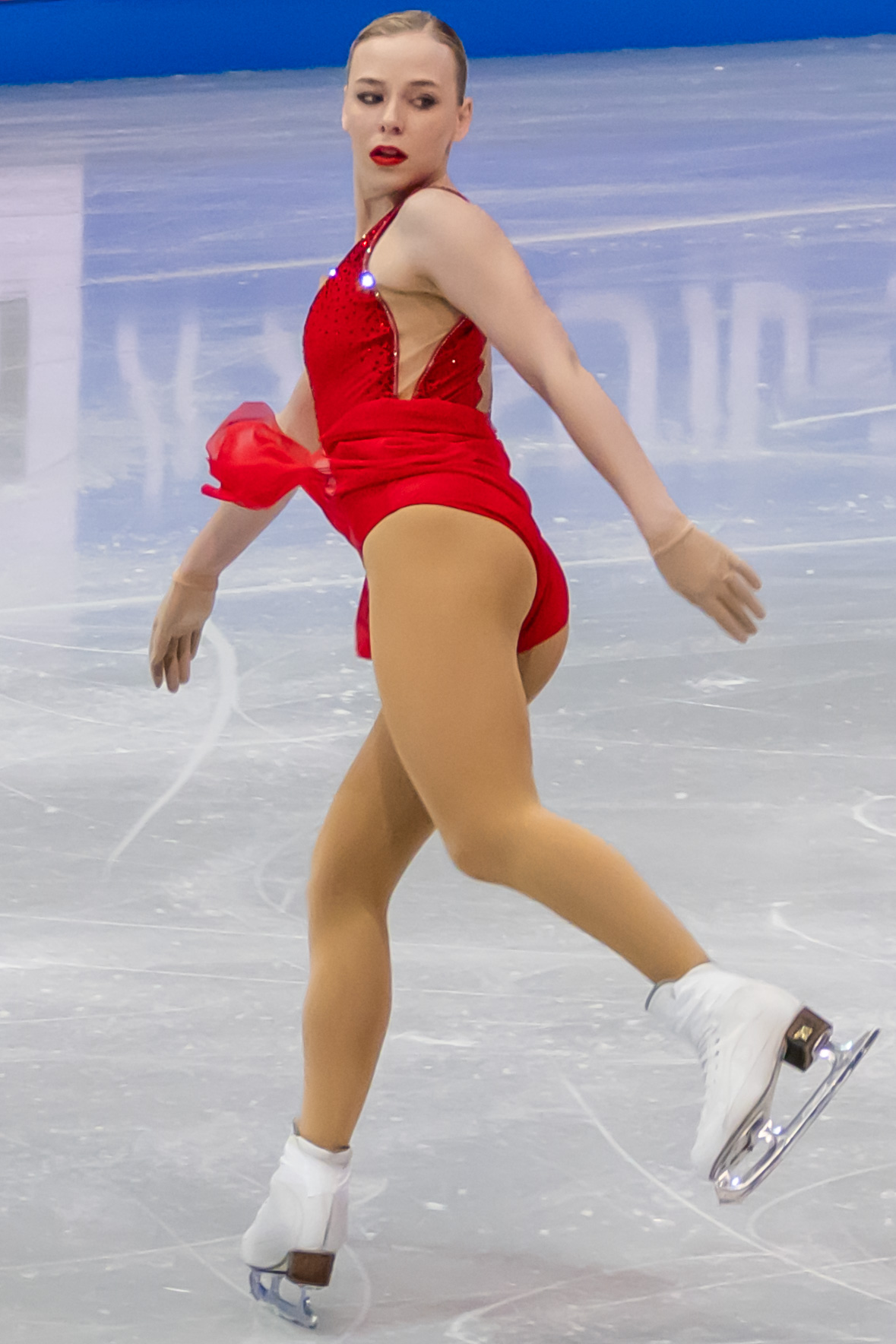
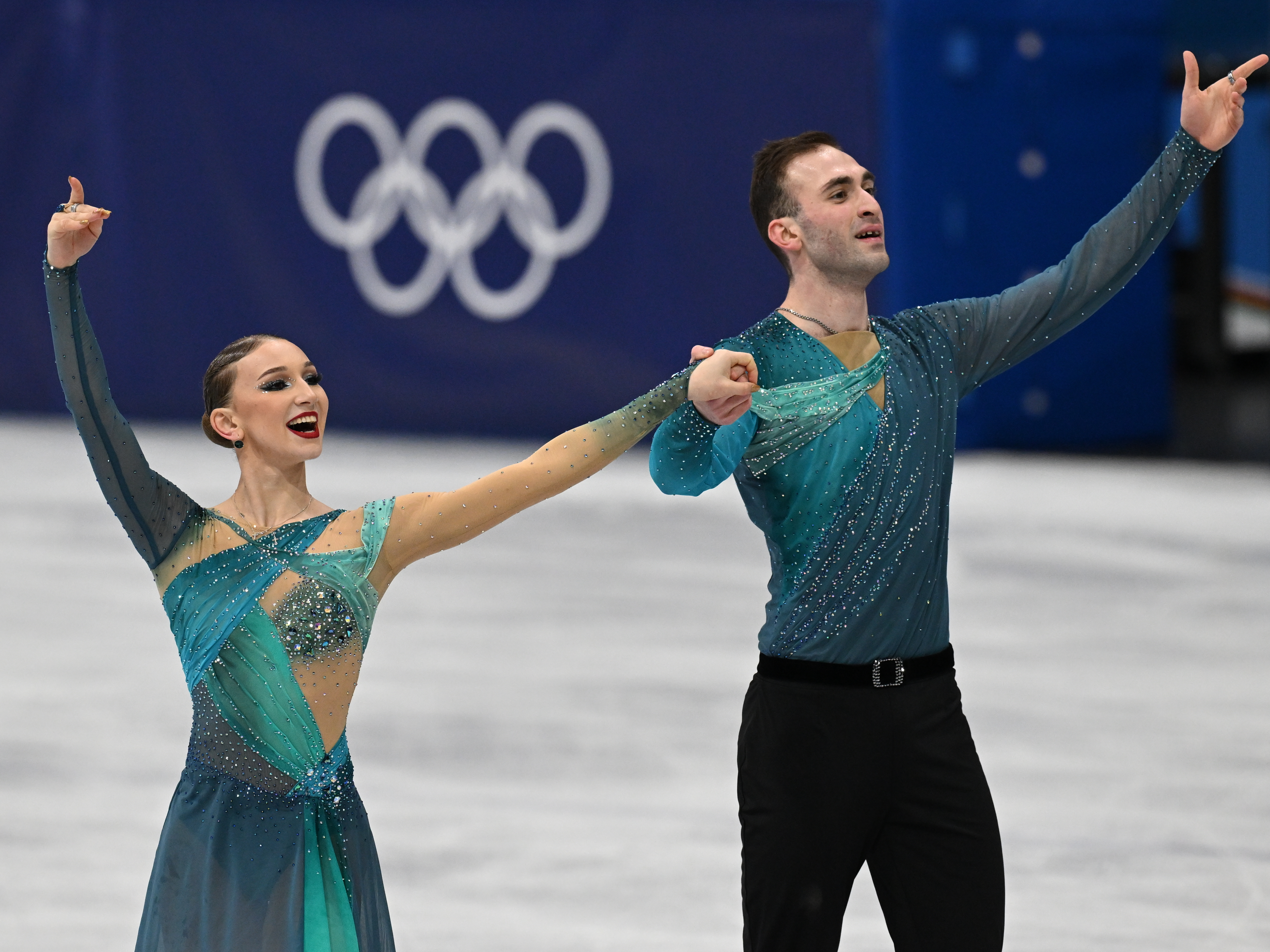
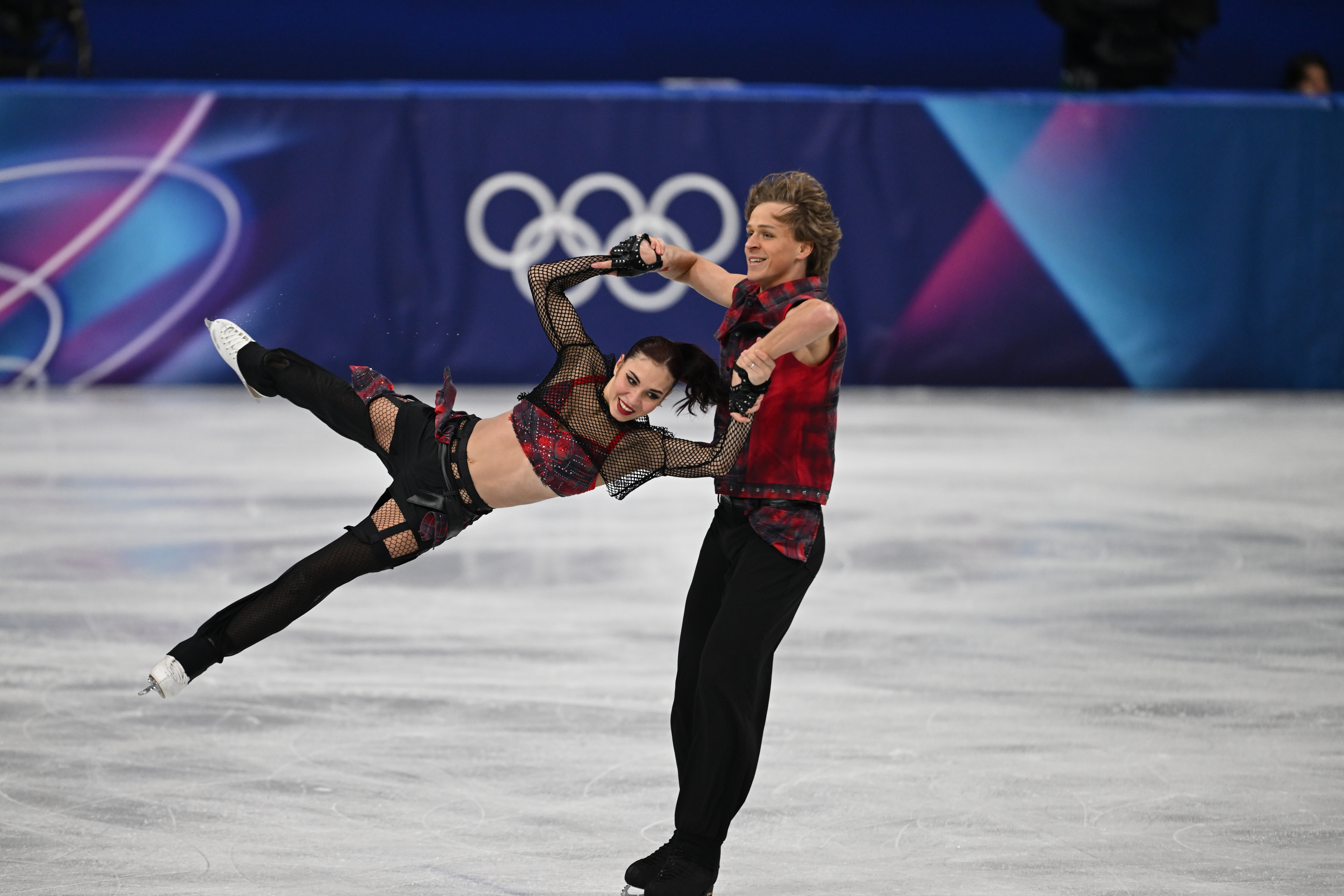
The 2026 Trialeti Trophy champions (from left to right): Nika Egadze of Georgia (men's singles); Niina Petrõkina of Estonia (women's singles); Anastasia Metelkina and Luka Berulava of Georgia (pairs); and Diana Davis and Gleb Smolkin of Georgia (ice dance)

Medalists
Discipline	Gold	Silver	Bronze
Men	(Georgia (country)) Nika Egadze	(Individual Neutral Athletes) Nikolai Ugozhaev	(Estonia) Mihhail Selevko
Women	(Estonia) Niina Petrõkina	(Individual Neutral Athletes) Adeliia Petrosian	(Individual Neutral Athletes) Anna Frolova
Pairs	(Georgia (country)); Anastasiia Metelkina; Luka Berulava	(Individual Neutral Athletes); Anastasia Mishina; Aleksandr Galliamov	(Individual Neutral Athletes); Ekaterina Chikmareva; Matvei Ianchenkov
Ice dance	(Georgia (country)); Diana Davis; Gleb Smolkin	(Individual Neutral Athletes); Elizaveta Pasechnik; Dario Cirisano	(Hungary); Mariia Ignateva; Danijil Szemko

== Results ==
=== Men's singles ===
Men's results
Rank	Skater	Nation	Total points	SP		FS	
1	Nika Egadze	Georgia	262.65	1	93.80	1	168.85
2	Nikolai Ugozhaev	(Individual Neutral Athletes) Individual Neutral Athlete	236.41	3	82.96	2	153.45
3	Mihhail Selevko	Estonia	227.74	2	87.87	5	139.87
4	Matvei Vetlugin	(Individual Neutral Athletes) Individual Neutral Athlete	219.94	4	73.96	3	145.98
5	Kyrylo Marsak	Ukraine	216.61	6	71.07	4	145.54
6	Lucius Kazanecki	United States	210.60	5	72.22	6	138.38
7	Vasil Barakhouski	(Individual Neutral Athletes) Individual Neutral Athlete	185.01	8	68.24	7	116.77
8	Raffaele Francesco Zich	Italy	175.82	7	69.79	9	106.03
9	Nikita Krivosheyev	Kazakhstan	172.13	11	57.40	8	114.73
10	Alex Labovich	(Individual Neutral Athletes) Individual Neutral Athlete	158.44	10	59.41	10	99.03
11	Valtter Virtanen	Finland	155.20	9	61.26	11	93.94
12	Oleg Melnikov	Kazakhstan	140.37	12	52.71	12	87.66

=== Women's singles ===
Women's results
Rank	Skater	Nation	Total points	SP		FS	
1	Niina Petrõkina	Estonia	205.94	1	74.69	2	131.25
2	Adeliia Petrosian	(Individual Neutral Athletes) Individual Neutral Athlete	204.16	4	68.42	1	135.74
3	Anna Frolova	(Individual Neutral Athletes) Individual Neutral Athlete	203.21	2	73.31	3	129.90
4	Anastasiia Gubanova	Georgia	189.31	3	70.69	5	118.62
5	Viktoriia Safonova	(Individual Neutral Athletes) Individual Neutral Athlete	186.88	6	62.93	4	123.95
6	Inga Gurgenidze	Georgia	177.55	5	63.66	6	113.89
7	Breken Brezden	Canada	160.36	7	60.06	8	100.30
8	Uliana Shiryaeva	Canada	152.54	8	54.06	9	98.48
9	Erica Machida	United States	147.64	13	44.95	7	102.69
10	Evelina Stavickyte	Lithuania	138.98	10	52.73	10	86.25
11	Chloe Levine	United States	138.22	9	53.77	11	84.45
12	Mariia Dmitrieva	Israel	127.23	11	51.12	13	76.11
13	Salma Agamova	Turkey	126.08	14	43.49	12	82.59
14	Mariia Arutiunian	Armenia	116.23	12	45.36	14	70.87

=== Pairs ===
Pairs results
Rank	Team	Nation	Total points	SP		FS	
1	Anastasiia Metelkina; Luka Berulava	Georgia	215.83	1	80.01	1	135.82
2	Anastasia Mishina; Aleksandr Galliamov	(Individual Neutral Athletes) Individual Neutral Athlete	206.31	3	73.48	2	132.83
3	Ekaterina Chikmareva; Matvei Ianchenkov	(Individual Neutral Athletes) Individual Neutral Athlete	196.63	2	74.00	3	122.63
4	Anastasia Mukhortova; Dmitry Evgenyev	(Individual Neutral Athletes) Individual Neutral Athlete	185.06	4	68.23	4	116.83
5	Katie McBeath; Balázs Nagy	United States	159.34	5	55.39	5	103.95
6	Sofiia Holichenko; Artem Darenskyi	Ukraine	158.19	6	54.32	6	103.87
7	Chelsea Liu; Ryan Bedard	United States	142.99	7	50.49	7	92.50

=== Ice dance ===
Ice dance results
Rank	Team	Nation	Total points	RD		FD	
1	Diana Davis; Gleb Smolkin	Georgia	208.67	1	85.23	1	123.44
2	Elizaveta Pasechnik; Dario Cirisano	(Individual Neutral Athletes) Individual Neutral Athlete	178.53	2	72.51	2	106.02
3	Mariia Ignateva; Danijil Szemko	Hungary	165.72	3	69.80	7	95.92
4	Ekaterina Andreeva; Dzmitryi Blinou	(Individual Neutral Athletes) Individual Neutral Athlete	165.65	4	67.74	4	97.91
5	Zoe Larson; Andrii Kapran	Ukraine	163.38	5	67.38	6	96.00
6	Elizaveta Shichina; Pavel Drozd	(Individual Neutral Athletes) Individual Neutral Athlete	162.69	6	66.90	8	95.79
7	Nadiia Bashynska; Noé Perron	Canada	160.55	8	62.28	3	98.27
8	Natacha Lagouge; Arnaud Caffa	France	158.33	9	62.16	5	96.17
9	Xiao Zixi; He Linghao	China	155.40	10	61.63	10	93.77
10	Alyssa Robinson; Jacob Portz	Canada	150.63	13	57.96	11	92.67
11	Samantha Ritter; Daniel Brykalov	Azerbaijan	149.53	11	59.69	12	89.84
12	Alisa Ovsiankina; Maximilien Rahier	France	147.65	7	62.82	14	84.83
13	Ekaterina Rybakova; Ivan Makhnonosov	(Individual Neutral Athletes) Individual Neutral Athlete	145.78	17	51.25	9	94.53
14	Arianna Sassi; Luca Morini	Switzerland	145.14	14	56.31	13	88.83
15	Lara Luft; Ilias Fourati	Hungary	137.60	12	58.46	16	79.14
16	Natalia Pallu-Neves; Jayin Panesar	Brazil	135.23	15	53.31	15	81.92
17	Viktoryia Plaskonnaya; Uladzislau Sytsik	(Individual Neutral Athletes) Individual Neutral Athlete	130.36	16	51.75	17	78.61
18	Maxine Weatherby; Oleksandr Kolosovskyi	Azerbaijan	120.81	18	47.18	18	73.63
WD	Denisa Cimlová; Stefano Frasca	Italy	Withdrew from competition				

== Works cited ==
- "Sports Rules – Single & Pair Skating and Ice Dance" (PDF). International Skating Union. Archived (PDF) from the original on 24 May 2026.
