= 2026 CS Cranberry Cup International =

International figure skating competition

2026 Cranberry Cup International
- Type: ISU Challenger Series
- Date: August 8 – 9
- Season: 2026–27
- Location: Norwood, Massachusetts, United States
- Host: U.S. Figure Skating
- Venue: Skating Club of Boston

Champions
- Men's singles: (Estonia) Aleksandr Selevko
- Women's singles: (South Korea) Kim Yu-seong
- Previous: 2025 CS Cranberry Cup International
- Next CS: 2026 CS Kinoshita Group Cup

The 2026 Cranberry Cup International is a figure skating competition sanctioned by the International Skating Union (ISU), organized and hosted by U.S. Figure Skating, and the first event of the 2026–27 ISU Challenger Series. It is held at the Skating Club of Boston in Norwood, Massachusetts, in the United States, from August 8 to 9. Medals are awarded in men's and women's singles, and skaters earn ISU World Standing points based on their results.

== Background ==
The inaugural edition of the Cranberry Cup International was held in 2021 at the Skating Club of Boston in Norwood, Massachusetts, in the United States. The 2026 Cranberry Cup is held from August 8 to 9.

The ISU Challenger Series was introduced in 2014. It is a series of international figure skating competitions sanctioned by the International Skating Union (ISU) and organized by ISU member nations. The objective was to ensure consistent organization and structure within a series of international competitions linked together, providing opportunities for senior-level skaters to compete at the international level and also earn ISU World Standing points. The 2026–27 Challenger Series consists of thirteen events, of which the Cranberry Cup International was the first. The Cranberry Cup International is held in conjunction with the John Nicks Pairs Challenge – the former hosts the men's and women's events, while the latter hosts the pairs event – and the two competitions constitute U.S. Figure Skating's contribution to the Challenger Series.

== Changes to preliminary assignments ==
The International Skating Union published the preliminary list of entrants on July 28, 2026.

Date	Discipline	Withdrew	Added	Ref.
July 31	Men	(Israel) Tamir Kuperman	(United States) Ryan Azadpour	
July 31	Men	—N/a	(United States) Will Annis	
July 31	Women	(Philippines) Cathryn Limketkai	—N/a	
July 31	Women	(United States) Sophie Joline von Felten	—N/a	
August 6	Women	(Philippines) Maxine Bautista	—N/a	
August 8	Women	(Azerbaijan) Nargiz Suleymanova	—N/a	

== Required performance elements ==
Men and women competing in single skating first perform a short program on August 8. Lasting no more than 2 minutes 40 seconds, the short program has to include the following elements:

For men: one double or triple Axel; one triple or quadruple jump; one jump combination consisting of a double jump and a triple jump, two triple jumps, or a quadruple jump and a double jump or triple jump; one flying spin; one camel spin or sit spin with a change of foot; one spin combination with a change of foot; and one step sequence using the full ice surface.

For women: one double or triple Axel; one triple jump; one jump combination consisting of a double jump and a triple jump, or two triple jumps; one flying spin; one layback spin, sideways leaning spin, camel spin, or sit spin without a change of foot; one spin combination with a change of foot; and one step sequence using the full ice surface.

Skaters perform their free skates on August 9. The free skate can last no more than 4 minutes, and has to include the following: six jump elements, of which one has to be an Axel-type jump; three spins, of which one has to be a spin combination, one a flying spin, and one a choreographic spin; one step sequence; and a choreographic sequence.

== Judging ==
Skaters are judged according to the required technical elements of their program (such as jumps and spins), as well as the overall presentation of their program, based on three program components (skating skills, presentation, and composition). Each technical element in a figure skating performance is assigned a predetermined base point value and scored by a panel of nine judges on a scale from −5 to +5 based on the quality of its execution. Each Grade of Execution (GOE) from –5 to +5 is assigned a value as indicated on the Scale of Values. For example, a triple Axel is worth a base value of 8.00 points, and a GOE of +3 is worth 2.40 points, so a triple Axel with a GOE of +3 earns 10.40 points. The judging panel's GOE for each element is determined by calculating the trimmed mean (the average after discarding the highest and lowest scores). The panel's scores for all elements are added together to generate a Total Elements Score. At the same time, the judges evaluate each performance based on the five aforementioned program components and assign each a score from 0.25 to 10 in 0.25-point increments. The judging panel's final score for each program component is also determined by calculating the trimmed mean. Those scores are then multiplied by the factor shown on the chart below; the results are added together to generate a total Program Component Score.

Program component factoring
Discipline	Short program or rhythm dance	Free skate or free dance
Men	1.67	3.33
Women	1.33	2.67

Deductions are applied for certain violations, such as time infractions, stops and restarts, or falls. The Total Elements Score and Program Component Score are then added together, minus any deductions, to generate a final performance score for each skater or team.

== Medal summary ==
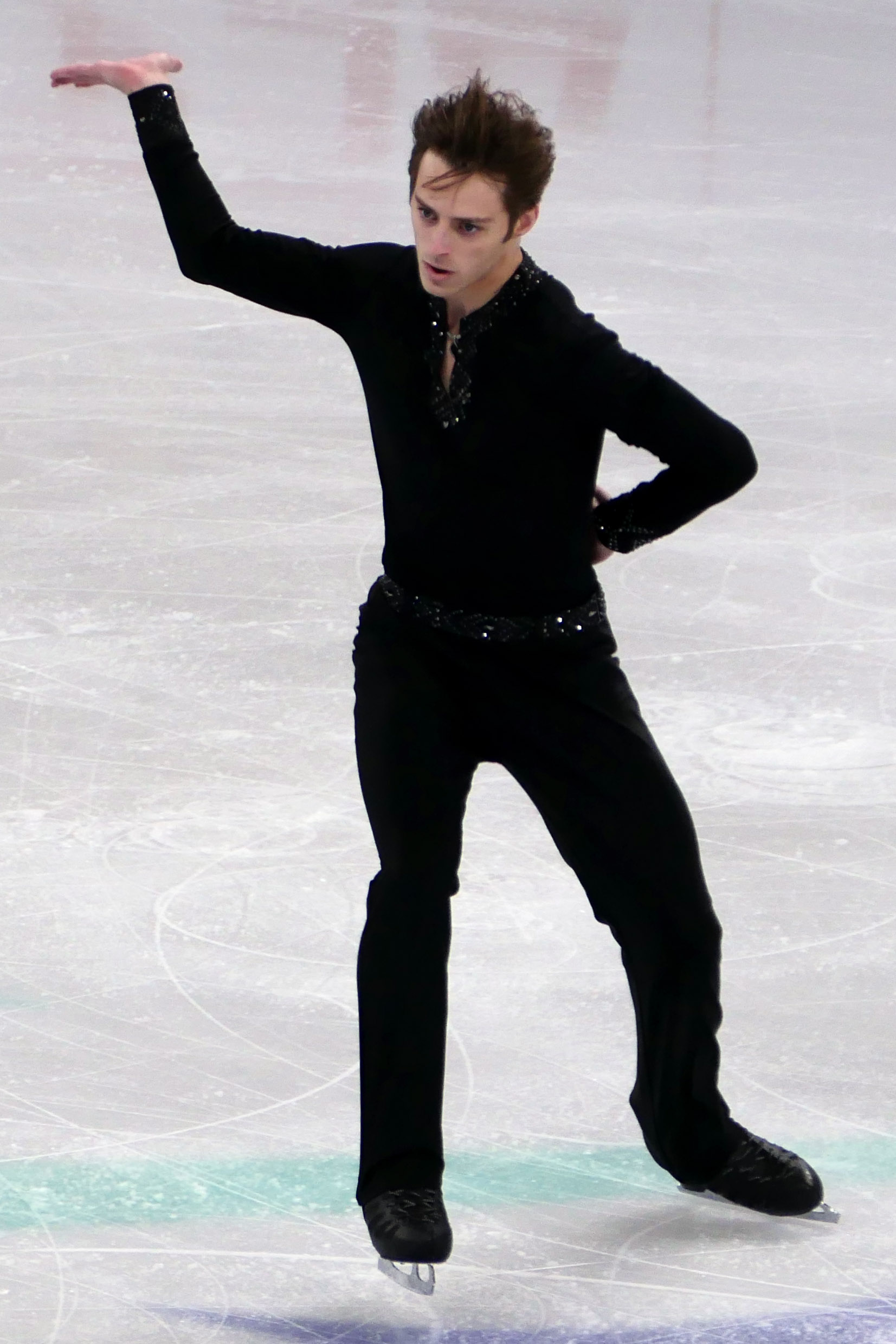
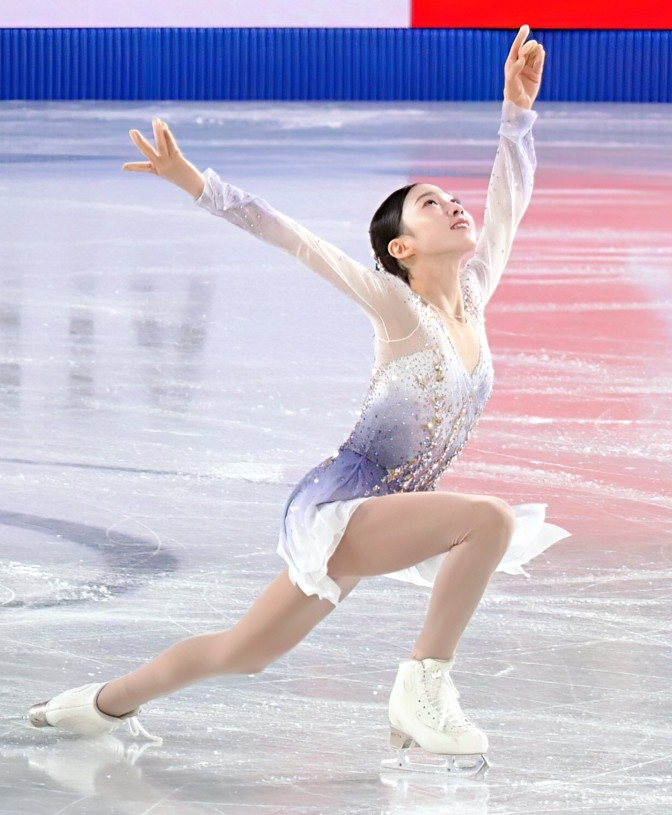
The 2026 Cranberry Cup International champions: Aleksandr Selevko of Estonia (men's singles) and Kim Yu-seong of South Korea (women's singles)

Medalists
Discipline	Gold	Silver	Bronze
Men	(Estonia) Aleksandr Selevko	(United States) Daniel Martynov	(Israel) Mark Gorodnitsky
Women	(South Korea) Kim Yu-seong	(South Korea) Kim Yu-jae	(United States) Logan Higase-Chen

== Results ==
=== Men's singles ===
Men's results
Rank	Skater	Nation	Total	SP		FS	
1st place, gold medalist(s)	Aleksandr Selevko	Estonia	246.15	1	87.65	1	158.50
2nd place, silver medalist(s)	Daniel Martynov	United States	221.38	3	79.34	2	142.04
3rd place, bronze medalist(s)	Mark Gorodnitsky	Israel	203.31	2	80.99	4	122.32
4	Kai Kovar	United States	198.26	4	67.80	3	130.46
5	Will Annis	United States	175.80	5	66.24	6	109.56
6	Ryan Azadpour	United States	170.83	8	53.25	5	117.58
7	Lev Vinokur	Israel	163.81	6	61.25	7	102.56
8	Gabriel Martínez	Ecuador	137.92	9	45.22	8	92.70
9	Oliver Praetorius	Sweden	135.39	7	55.81	9	79.58

=== Women's singles ===
Women's results
Rank	Skater	Nation	Total	SP		FS	
1st place, gold medalist(s)	Kim Yu-seong	South Korea	202.70	1	67.77	1	134.93
2nd place, silver medalist(s)	Kim Yu-jae	South Korea	180.92	2	66.59	3	114.33
3rd place, bronze medalist(s)	Logan Higase-Chen	United States	176.46	3	61.46	2	115.00
4	Chloe Levine	United States	164.61	4	52.85	4	111.76
5	Olivia Phillips	Sweden	151.79	5	52.15	5	99.64
6	Marietta Atkins	Poland	112.26	8	35.20	6	77.06
7	Uma Zagele	Lithuania	111.94	7	40.92	7	71.02
8	Misheel Otgonbaatar	Mongolia	77.52	9	26.87	8	50.65
WD	Katie Shen	United States	Withdrew	6	48.93	Withdrew from competition	

== Works cited ==
- "Sports Rules – Single & Pair Skating and Ice Dance" (PDF). International Skating Union. Archived (PDF) from the original on May 24, 2026.
