= Kim Yu-jae =

South Korean figure skater (born 2009)

- Kim at the 2026 Skate America

Personal information
- Native name: 김유재
- Other names: Yujae Kim
- Born: 12 June 2009 (age 17) Seoul, South Korea
- Home town: Anyang
- Height: 1.61 m (5 ft 3 in)

Figure skating career
- Country: South Korea
- Coach: Choi Hyung-kyung; Kim Na-hyun
- Skating club: C&K Team
- Began skating: 2019

Medal record
South Korean Championships
Bronze medal – third place	2025 Uijeongbu	Singles

Kim Yu-jae (Korean: 김유재; born 12 June 2009) is a South Korean figure skater. She is the 2025 South Korean national bronze medalist, a five-time medalist on the ISU Junior Grand Prix, the 2026 CS Denis Ten Memorial silver medalist and the 2022 South Korean national junior silver medalist. She placed fourth at the 2023 World Junior Championships.

== Personal life ==
Kim was born on 12 June 2009 in Seoul. Her fraternal twin sister, Yu-seong, who is six minutes younger than her, is also a competitive figure skater.

== Career ==
=== Early years ===
Kim's mother, Ga-young, first enrolled her and her sister Yu-seong into figure skating when they were eight years old as a means of improving their health and growth. Due to the lack of skating rinks where they lived, the family moved to Gwacheon in 2019, where both sisters began training under Choi Hyung-kyung.

Kim won the silver medal at the 2022 South Korean Junior Championships at the age of twelve.

=== 2022–23 season ===
Based on her junior national podium the previous year, Kim was sent to make her international junior debut on the Junior Grand Prix. Given one assignment, she won the bronze medal at the 2022 JGP France in Courchevel. Kim attempted a triple Axel in the free skate, a rarity among female skaters, landing it a quarter-underrotated.

After finishing sixth at the 2023 South Korean Championships at the senior level, Kim was given one of three South Korean berths at the 2023 World Junior Championships in Calgary. She finished fourth in the short program with a new personal best, despite receiving a quarter-underrotation call on her triple loop attempt. In the free skate, Kim successfully landed the triple Axel and received only one quarter call on her other six triple jumps. She was fourth in that segment as well, finishing fourth overall. She indicated that her next goal would be to put two triple Axels in her free skate.

=== 2023–24 season ===
In late July, Kim competed at the 2023 South Korean Junior Grand Prix Qualifiers, where she finished sixth. Her performances earned her one assignment on the Junior Grand Prix circuit. She won the bronze medal at the 2023 JGP Turkey.

In late September, it was announced that Kim and her sister made a coaching change from Choi Hyung-kyung to Chi Hyun-jung and Kim Jin-seo.

Kim went on to compete at the senior national ranking competition, where she finished sixth overall. At the 2024 South Korean Championships, Kim placed fifth. With this result, both Kim and her sister, who finished fourth at the event, were selected to represent South Korea at the 2024 World Junior Championships. She came sixteenth at the event, while Yu-seong was fifteenth.

=== 2024–25 season: National bronze medal ===
Kim began the season by placing third at the 2024 South Korean Junior Grand Prix Qualifiers in late July and was given two Junior Grand Prix assignments as a result of her placement. The following month, it was announced that Kim and her sister had left coaches Chi Hyun-jung and Kim Jin-seo to return to their longtime coach, Choi Hyung-kyung.

Kim then opened her international season by winning the bronze medal at 2024 JGP Czech Republic before going on to finish seventh at 2024 JGP Poland. In late November, she would compete at the South Korean Ranking Competition, finishing in sixth place. One month later, Kim won the bronze medal at the 2025 South Korean Championships. Selected to compete at the 2025 World Junior Championships in Debrecen, Hungary, Kim finished in sixteenth place.

=== 2025–26 season ===
Kim started the season by winning the 2025 South Korean Junior Grand Prix Qualifiers in late July and was given two Junior Grand Prix assignments as a result of her placement. The following month, Kim competed at the 2025 JGP Turkey, where she placed fifth in the short program but won the free skate, allowing her to win the silver medal overall. At the 2025 JGP Poland, Kim won her first JGP gold medal. Both results allowed Kim to qualify for the 2025–26 Junior Grand Prix Final. Her sister, Yu-seong, also qualified for the event. During the competition, Kim placed sixth in the short program and second in the free skate, ultimately settling for fourth place overall.

Kim performing at the 2026 Skate America

In January, she finished fourth at the 2026 South Korean Championships.

=== 2026–27 season ===
Kim opened the season at the 2026 CS Cranberry Cup International for her senior international debut. She finished in second place, sharing the podium with her sister Yu-seong. Kim went onto win silver at the 2026 CS Denis Ten Memorial, behind Alexandra Ignatova.

In October, Kim made her senior Grand Prix debut at the 2026 Skate Canada International. Kim concluded the event in seventh place overall. The following month, Kim competed at her second Grand Prix stage at the 2026 Skate America. After placing third in the short program, Kim placed fifth in the free skate, dropping to fourth place overall.

== Programs ==
Season	Short program	Free skating	Exhibition
2026–2027	Frida; Burning Bed; Burn it Blue by Elliot Goldenthal choreo. by Kaitlyn Weaver	Gladiator; Now We Are Free by Hans Zimmer & Lisa Gerrard; Barbarian Horde by Hans Zimmer & Nick Glennie-Smith choreo. by Shin Yea-ji	
2025–2026	ICARUS (Orchestral Version) by Tony Ann ft. ARKAI choreo. by Misha Ge	The Council of Elrond (Theme for Aragorn and Arwen); May It Be (from The Lord of the Rings: The Fellowship of the Ring) by Howard Shore & Enya; Númenor (from The Lord of the Rings: The Rings of Power) by Bear McCreary choreo. by Shin Yea-ji	
2024–2025	Love Story by Francis Lai performed by Lola Astanova & Stjepan Hauser choreo. by Shin Yea-ji	Swan Lake by Pyotr Ilyich Tchaikovsky choreo. by Misha Ge	
2023–2024	Spanish Romance by Liona Boyd; Fiesta Flamenca by 101 Strings Orchestra choreo. by Shin Yea-ji	Avatar: The Way of Water; Songcord Chapter; Songcord Opening performed by Zoe Saldaña; The Way of Water; The Spirit Tree; Na'vi Attack by Simon Franglen choreo. by Shin Yea-ji	
2022–2023	Four Seasons by Antonio Vivaldi performed by Max Richter, Chineke! Orchestra, Elena Urioste choreo. by Shin Yea-ji	Aida; Every Story is a Love Story; Dance of the Robe by Elton John performed by Sherie Rene Scott, Heather Headley, & Schele Williams choreo. by Shin Yea-ji	

== Competitive highlights ==
- GP – Event of the ISU Grand Prix Series
- JGP – Event of the ISU Junior Grand Prix Series
- CS – Event of the ISU Challenger Series
- TBD – Assigned
- WD – Withdrew from competition

Competition placements at senior level
Season	2022–23	2023–24	2024–25	2025-26	2026–27
South Korean Championships	6th	5th	3rd	4th	
GP Skate America					4th
GP Skate Canada					7th
CS Cranberry Cup					2nd
CS Denis Ten Memorial					2nd

Competition placements at junior level
Season	2021–22	2022–23	2023–24	2024–25	2025–26
World Junior Championships		4th	16th	16th	
South Korean Championships	2nd				
JGP Final					4th
JGP Czech Republic				3rd	
JGP France		3rd			
JGP Poland				7th	1st
JGP Turkey			3rd		2nd
Thailand Open Trophy				2nd	

== Detailed results ==
ISU personal best scores in the +5/-5 GOE System
Segment	Type	Score	Event
Total	**TSS**	**209.20**	2026 CS Denis Ten Memorial
Short program	**TSS**	**75.99**	2026 CS Denis Ten Memorial
Short program	TES	43.60	2026 CS Denis Ten Memorial
Short program	PCS	32.39	2026 CS Denis Ten Memorial
Free skating	**TSS**	**137.17**	2025 JGP Poland
Free skating	TES	76.24	2025 JGP Poland
Free skating	PCS	63.55	2026 CS Denis Ten Memorial

=== Senior level ===
- Small medals for the short program and free skating are only awarded at ISU Championships.
- Medals at team events are awarded for the team results only. Individual placements at team events are listed in parentheses.
- ISU Personal Bests highlighted in **bold**.

Results in the 2026–27 season
Date	Event	SP		FS		Total	
Date	Event	P	Score	P	Score	P	Score
Aug 6–9, 2026	(United States) 2026 CS Cranberry Cup International	2	66.59	3	114.33	2	180.92
Oct 8–11, 2026	(Kazakhstan) 2026 CS Denis Ten Memorial Challenge	2	**75.99**	3	133.21	2	**209.20**
Oct 30 - Nov 1, 2026	2026 Skate Canada International	8	63.50	8	118.13	7	181.63

=== Junior level ===
Results in the 2021–22 season
Date	Event	SP		FS		Total	
Date	Event	P	Score	P	Score	P	Score
Jan 7 – 9, 2022	(South Korea) 2022 South Korean Championships (Junior)	2	55.11	2	93.89	2	149.00

Results in the 2022–23 season
Date	Event	SP		FS		Total	
Date	Event	P	Score	P	Score	P	Score
Aug 24 – 27, 2022	2022 JGP France	3	60.87	2	124.80	3	185.67
Jan 5 – 8, 2023	(South Korea) 2023 South Korean Championships (Senior)	10	63.33	5	130.64	6	193.97
Feb 27 – Mar 5, 2023	(Canada) 2023 World Junior Championships	4	63.97	4	129.65	4	193.62

Results in the 2023–24 season
Date	Event	SP		FS		Total	
Date	Event	P	Score	P	Score	P	Score
Sep 6 – 8, 2023	2023 JGP Turkey	3	65.33	4	118.32	3	183.65
Jan 4 – 7, 2024	(South Korea) 2024 South Korean Championships (Senior)	4	66.04	5	132.43	5	198.47
Feb 26 – Mar 3, 2024	(Taiwan) 2024 World Junior Championships	18	54.98	13	112.86	16	167.84

Results in the 2024–25 season
Date	Event	SP		FS		Total	
Date	Event	P	Score	P	Score	P	Score
Sep 4 – 9, 2024	2024 JGP Czech Republic	4	61.20	3	117.59	3	178.79
Sep 25 – 28, 2024	2024 JGP Poland	5	63.85	10	96.34	7	160.19
Jan 2 – 5, 2025	(South Korea) 2025 South Korean Championships (Senior)	3	67.76	5	126.16	3	193.92
Feb 25 – Mar 2, 2025	(Hungary) 2025 World Junior Championships	21	54.30	14	114.33	16	168.63
May 2 – 6, 2025	2025 Thailand Open	2	57.34	2	114.25	2	171.59

Results in the 2025–26 season
Date	Event	SP		FS		Total	
Date	Event	P	Score	P	Score	P	Score
Aug 27 – 30, 2025	2025 JGP Turkey	5	62.52	1	133.58	2	196.10
Oct 1 – 4, 2025	2025 JGP Poland	3	62.69	1	**137.17**	1	199.86
Dec 4 – 7, 2025	(Japan) 2025-26 Junior Grand Prix Final	6	60.02	2	135.36	4	195.38
Jan 3 – 6, 2026	(South Korea) 2026 South Korean Championships (Senior)	6	64.98	3	134.76	4	199.74
