= Vladislav Dikidzhi =

Russian figure skater (born 2004)

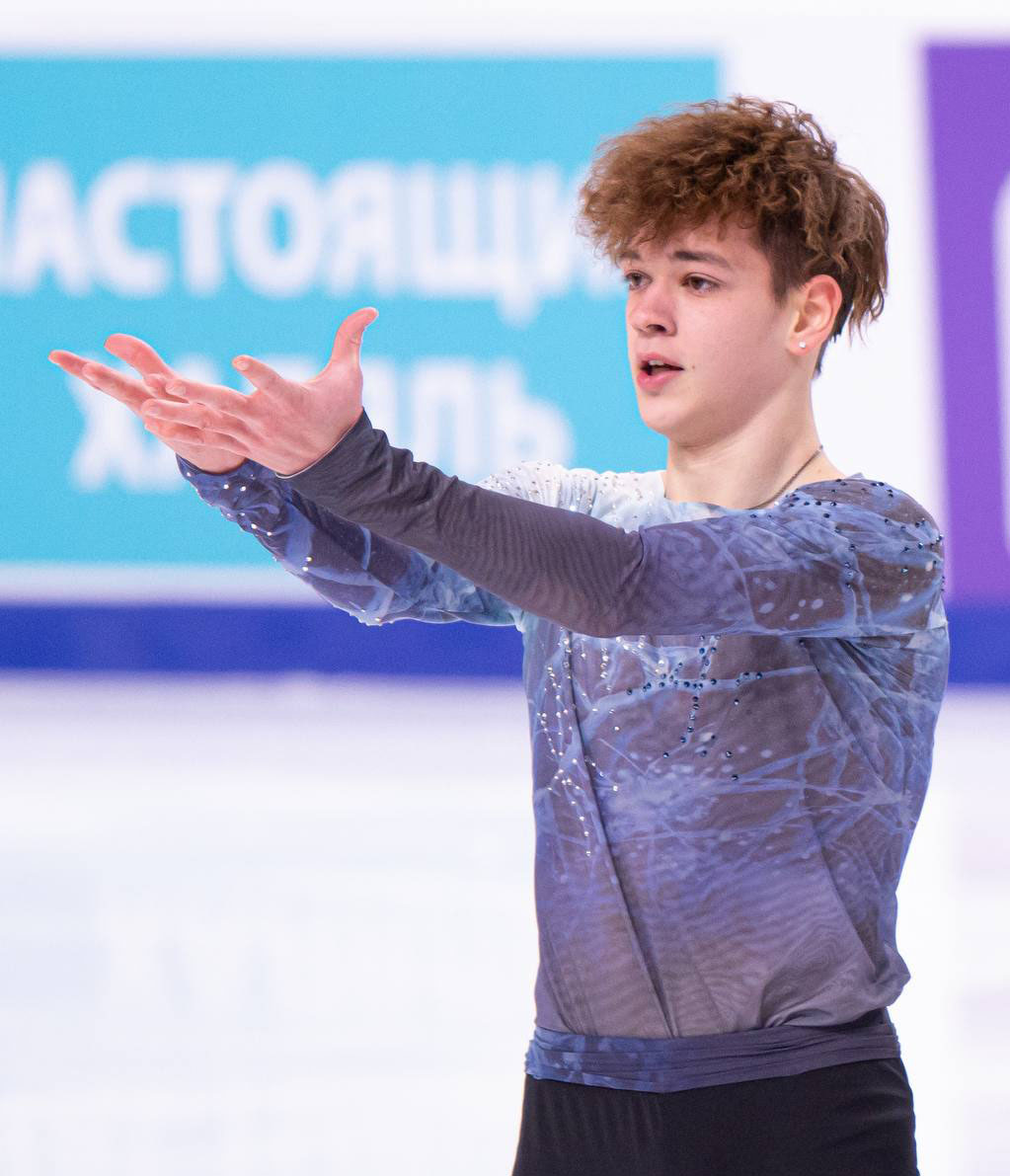
- Vladislav Dikidzhi at the 2024 Russian Championships

Personal information
- Native name: Владислав Максимович Дикиджи
- Full name: Vladislav Maksimovich Dikidzhi
- Born: 22 August 2004 (age 22) Saint Petersburg, Russia

Figure skating career
- Country: (Individual Neutral Athletes) Individual Neutral Athlete; Russia
- Discipline: Men's singles
- Coach: Oleg Tataurov
- Skating club: Zvezdnyi Led St. Petersburg
- Began skating: 2008

Medal record
Russian Championships
Gold medal – first place	2025 Omsk	Singles
Silver medal – second place	2024 Chelyabinsk	Singles

Vladislav Maksimovich Dikidzhi (Russian: Владислав Максимович Дикиджи; born 22 August 2004) is a Russian figure skater competing in men's singles, who currently competes as an Individual Neutral Athlete. He is the 2025 Russian national champion and 2024 Russian national silver medalist. Internationally, he is a two-time ISU Challenger Series gold medalist and the 2026 Cup of China silver medalist.

He has landed quadruple Axels in practice.

== Personal life ==
Dikidzhi was born on 22 August 2004 in Saint Petersburg, Russia to a Russian mother and a Bulgarian father with Turkish roots. In Turkish, Dikidzhi's last name means "tailor." He also has a younger sister, Valeria.

In February 2024, Dikidzhi was nearly stabbed while riding a metro in Saint Petersburg after an intoxicated man suddenly grabbed him and held a knife to his throat after demanding that Dikidzhi give up his seat. Fortunately, Dikidzhi was able to fend off the attacker and flee the scene. Although he reported the incident to Russian police, all charges against the attacker were ultimately dropped.

In mid-2025, he was included on the Forbes 30 Under 30 list.

His figure skating idol is Nathan Chen.

== Career ==
=== Early career ===
Dikidzhi began figure skating at the age of four. His first coach was Tatiana Petrova, who trained him at the Nevsky Ice Skating School. At the age of ten, Dikidzhi transferred to the Zvezdny Led Skating School, where Oleg Tataurov became his coach.

He made his national debut at the 2019 Russian Junior Championships, where he finished in sixteenth place. Dikidzhi then subsequently went on to place fourteenth at the 2020 Russian Junior Championships and sixth at the 2021 Russian Junior Championships.

=== 2021–22 season ===
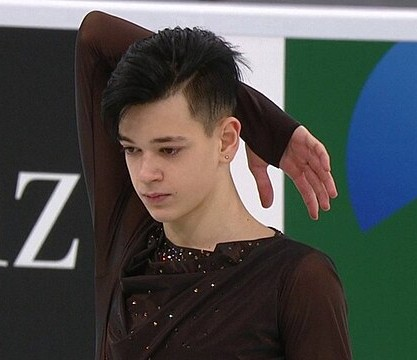
Dikidzhi at Stage 4 of the 2021 Russian Cup series

Making his international debut on the junior level at the 2021 Denis Ten Memorial Challenge, Dikidzhi won the gold medal. He then went on to make his senior national debut at the 2022 Russian Championships, where he finished in eleventh place.

Dikidzhi subsequently closed the season by placing ninth at the 2022 Russian Junior Championships.

=== 2022–23 season ===
Due to Russia's invasion of Ukraine in February 2022, the International Skating Union barred all Russian figure skaters from competing at international competitions. Dikidzhi was therefore only able to compete at Russian domestic events.

During that season, he placed fifth at the 2023 Russian Junior Championships.

=== 2023–24 season ===
Making his senior debut on the Russian Grand Prix series, Dikidzhi won gold at the 2023 Russian Grand Prix Stage 4 and at the Russian Grand Prix Stage 6. He followed up these results by winning the silver medal at the 2024 Russian Championships behind Evgeni Semenenko.

Dikidzhi then concluded the season by winning the bronze medal at the 2024 Russian Grand Prix Final.

=== 2024–25 season: National champion ===
Dikidzhi opened the season by winning gold at the 2024 Russian Grand Prix Stage 2 and at the 2024 Russian Grand Prix Stage 5.

In December, he competed at the 2025 Russian Championships. After placing sixth in the short program, Dikidzhi won the free skate segment and ultimately won the gold medal overall. He then finished the season by placing fourth at the 2025 Russian Grand Prix Final.

=== 2025–26 season ===
In May 2025, the International Skating Union (ISU) announced that Dikidzhi as well as Petr Gumennik had both been approved as Individual Neutral Athletes (AIN), making them both eligible to compete at the 2025 ISU Olympic Qualifying Competition to vie for a spot to compete at the 2026 Winter Olympics. The Figure Skating Federation of Russia selected Gumennik to compete and Dikidzhi as the reserve.

He opened the season in November by winning gold at 2025 Russian Grand Prix III, Kazan and bronze at 2025 Russian Grand Prix V, Omsk. In December, he placed seventh at the 2026 Russian Championships.

=== 2026–27 season ===
On 30 June 2026, the International Skating Union announced that figure skaters from Russia and Belarus would be allowed to compete at international competitions as Individual Neutral Athletes (AINs). Each of these skaters are required to undergo an individual assessment conducted by the ISU Council to determine whether they meet the criteria for neutral status. Dikidzhi's application was approved, making him eligible to compete internationally as a neutral athlete.

Dikidzhi was assigned to the 2026 CS Kinoshita Group Cup, replacing Mark Kondratiuk.

Dikidzhi made his senior international debut at the Kinoshita Group Cup placing 2nd behind Rio Nakata of Japan in the short program. In the free skate segment, Vladislav placed 3rd in that segment, but concluded the event in 1st place overall. Vladislav's first place result allowed him to become the first alternate on the Grand Prix alternate list. China gave up one of their host pick spots for the upcoming 2026 Cup of China and he was assigned to the competition.

The following month, Dikidzhi competed at the 2026 CS Denis Ten Memorial Challenge in Kazakhstan. Dikidzhi won the gold medal, earning new personal best scores across both program segments and overall. His total score of 312.79 became the fourth highest overall score in men's singles. Following the withdrawal of Cha Jun-hwan, Vlad was later assigned to NHK Trophy as his second Grand Prix spot.

In November, Dikidzhi competed at 2026 Cup of China, placing fourth in the short program, second in the free skate, and second overall. “I think there are still a lot of things I need to improve, especially on the technical side,” said Dikidzhi after the free skate. “I feel like I only showed about 80% of my technical ability today.”

== Programs ==
Season	Short program	Free skating	Exhibition
2026–2027	Experience (Starkey Remix) by Ludovico Einaudi; Comptine d'un autre été: L'Après-midi (from Amélie) by Yann Tiersen choreo. by Natalia Tushinskaya	Feeling the Sound by Artem Uzunov and Nim Studio choreo. by Nikita Mikhailov	Experience (Starkey Remix); Comptine d'un autre été: L'Après-midi
2025–2026	Interstellar: Main Theme performed by 2Hooks; Interstellar (Post-Rock Version) performed by Kwoon choreo. by Egor Murashov	Night on Bald Mountain (Ночь на лысой горе) by Modest Mussorgsky performed by Bel Suono choreo. by Natalia Bestemianova, Igor Bobrin	
2024–2025	Natural Blues by Gruppa Skryptonite & Therr Maitz choreo. by Egor Murashov	Für Elise (Morbius Remix) (from Morbius) by Ludwig van Beethoven performed by Elephant Music choreo. by Nikita Mikhailov, Natalia Tushinskaia	
2023–2024	Winter Elergy; Winter by Duomo choreo. by Egor Murashov	The Game Is Afoot by Eternal Eclipse choreo. by Nikita Mikhailov, Natalia Tushinskaia	
2022–2023	Lord & Master by Apashe choreo. by Natalia Tushinskaia, Alexandra Akhlestina	The Game Is Afoot by Eternal Eclipse choreo. by Nikita Mikhailov, Natalia Tushinskaia	
2021–2022	Lord & Master by Apashe choreo. by Natalia Tushinskaia, Alexandra Akhlestina	Chronos by Kirill Richter choreo. by Natalia Tushinskaia, Alexandra Akhlestina	
2020–2021	Kairos by Derek Hough ft. Lindsey Stirling	Chronos by Kirill Richter choreo. by Natalia Tushinskaia, Alexandra Akhlestina	
2019–2020	Kairos by Derek Hough ft. Lindsey Stirling	Variations for Cello & Orchestra: Introduction; Variations for Cello & Orchestra: Variation 19, 20 and 5; Variations on Variations by Andrew Lloyd Webber & Harry Rabinowitz	
2018–2019	Lautory by Oleg Ponomarev, Sergey Vorontsov, & Konstantin Gogunskiy	Variations for Cello & Orchestra: Introduction; Variations for Cello & Orchestra: Variation 19, 20 and 5; Variations on Variations by Andrew Lloyd Webber & Harry Rabinowitz	

== Competitive highlights ==
=== Skating as an Individual Neutral Athlete ===
Competition placements at senior level
Season	2026–27
GP Cup of China	2nd
GP NHK Trophy	TBD
CS Denis Ten Memorial	1st
CS Kinoshita Group Cup	1st

=== Skating for Russia ===
Competition placements at senior level
Season	2021–22	2022–23	2023–24	2024–25	2025–26	2026–27
Russian Championships	11th		2nd	1st	7th	
Russian Cup Final			3rd	4th		
Russian GP Stage 2				1st		1st
Russian GP Stage 3	4th				1st	
Russian GP Stage 4	1st		1st			
Russian GP Stage 5				1st		

Competition placements at junior level
Season	2016–17	2017–18	2018–19	2019–20	2020-21	2021-22	2022-23
Russian Championships			16th	14th	6th	9th	5th
Russian Cup Final			7th	8th	1st	1st	10th
Russian GP Stage 1	6th						
Russian GP Stage 2		8th					
Russian GP Stage 3					2nd		5th
Russian GP Stage 4		4th	2nd	2nd	2nd		
Russian GP Stage 5	8th		3rd	3rd			3rd
CS Denis Ten Memorial						1st	

== Detailed results ==
ISU personal best scores in the +5/-5 GOE System
Segment	Type	Score	Event
Total	TSS	312.79	2026 Denis Ten Memorial
Short program	TSS	107.31	2026 Denis Ten Memorial
Short program	TES	62.80	2026 Denis Ten Memorial
Short program	PCS	44.51	2026 Denis Ten Memorial
Free skating	TSS	205.48	2026 Denis Ten Memorial
Free skating	TES	114.74	2026 Denis Ten Memorial
Free skating	PCS	90.74	2026 Denis Ten Memorial

=== Skating as an Individual Neutral Athlete ===
Results in the 2026–27 season
Date	Event	SP		FS		Total	
Date	Event	P	Score	P	Score	P	Score
Sept 4–6, 2026	(Japan) 2026 Kinoshita Group Cup	2	88.79	3	176.89	1	265.68
Oct 8–11, 2026	(Kazakhstan) 2026 CS Denis Ten Memorial Challenge	1	107.31	1	205.48	1	312.79
Nov 6-8, 2026	2026 Cup of China	4	98.86	2	183.58	2	282.44

=== Skating for Russia ===
Results in the 2021–22 season
Date	Event	SP		FS		Total	
Date	Event	P	Score	P	Score	P	Score
Oct 24 – 28, 2021	(Russia) 2021 Russian Grand Prix Stage III, Sirius	5	82.01	4	151.93	4	233.94
Nov 8 – 12, 2021	(Russia) 2021 Russian Grand Prix Stage IV, Kazan	1	88.18	1	171.91	1	260.09
Dec 21 – 26, 2021	(Russia) 2024 Russian Championships	15	82.24	7	167.93	11	250.17

Results in the 2023–24 season
Date	Event	SP		FS		Total	
Date	Event	P	Score	P	Score	P	Score
Nov 10 – 13, 2023	(Russia) 2023 Russian Grand Prix Stage IV, Kazan	2	97.35	1	190.05	1	287.40
Nov 24 – 27, 2023	(Russia) 2023 Russian Grand Prix Stage VI, Moscow	3	94.48	1	188.33	1	282.81
Dec 20 – 24, 2023	(Russia) 2024 Russian Championships	1	102.70	3	191.04	2	293.74
Fed 14 – 19, 2025	(Russia) 2024 Russian Grand Prix Final	2	99.92	4	183.56	3	283.48

Results in the 2024–25 season
Date	Event	SP		FS		Total	
Date	Event	P	Score	P	Score	P	Score
Nov 1 – 4, 2024	(Russia) 2024 Russian Grand Prix Stage II, Kazan	1	101.45	1	186.87	1	288.32
Nov 22 – 25, 2024	(Russia) 2024 Russian Grand Prix Stage V, St. Petersburg	1	102.22	1	200.25	1	302.47
Dec 19 – 22, 2025	(Russia) 2025 Russian Championships	6	96.28	1	200.82	1	297.10
Feb 14 – 16, 2025	(Russia) 2025 Russian Grand Prix Final	4	99.14	4	188.03	4	287.17

Results in the 2025–26 season
Date	Event	SP		FS		Total	
Date	Event	P	Score	P	Score	P	Score
Nov 7 – 10, 2025	(Russia) 2025 Russian Grand Prix Stage III, Kazan	1	94.51	1	184.61	1	279.12
Nov 21 – 24, 2025	(Russia) 2025 Russian Grand Prix Stage V, Omsk	3	84.28	2	172.94	3	257.22
Dec 17 – 21, 2025	(Russia) 2026 Russian Championships	9	86.90	6	167.35	7	254.25

Results in the 2026–27 season
Date	Event	SP		FS		Total	
Date	Event	P	Score	P	Score	P	Score
Oct 22–26, 2026	(Russia) 2026 Russian Grand Prix Stage, St. Petersburg	2	107.83	1	189.84	1	297.67

=== Junior level ===
Results in the 2016–17 season
Date	Event	SP		FS		Total	
Date	Event	P	Score	P	Score	P	Score
Sep 25 – 29, 2016	(Russia) 2016 Russian Grand Prix Stage I, Samara	6	58.54	6	111.78	6	170.32
Dec 2 – 6, 2016	(Russia) 2016 Russian Grand Prix Stage V, Moscow	3	65.26	10	118.27	8	183.53

Results in the 2017–18 season
Date	Event	SP		FS		Total	
Date	Event	P	Score	P	Score	P	Score
Oct 12 – 16, 2017	(Russia) 2017 Russian Grand Prix Stage II, Yoshkar	10	61.10	5	132.15	8	193.25
Nov 7 – 11, 2017	(Russia) 2017 Russian Grand Prix Stage IV, Kazan	7	69.02	4	136.74	4	205.76

Results in the 2018–19 season
Date	Event	SP		FS		Total	
Date	Event	P	Score	P	Score	P	Score
Nov 6 – 10, 2018	(Russia) 2018 Russian Grand Prix Stage IV, Kazan	2	72.84	1	137.50	2	210.34
Nov 20 – 24, 2018	(Russia) 2018 Russian Grand Prix Stage V, Moscow	2	75.32	4	137.63	3	212.95
Jan 31 – Feb 4, 2019	(Russia) 2019 Russian Junior Championships	8	77.95	17	116.14	16	194.09
Feb 18 – 22, 2019	(Russia) 2019 Russian Grand Prix Final	10	66.92	5	134.29	7	201.21

Results in the 2019–20 season
Date	Event	SP		FS		Total	
Date	Event	P	Score	P	Score	P	Score
Nov 11 – 15, 2019	(Russia) 2019 Russian Grand Prix Stage IV, Kazan	2	74.42	2	143.38	2	217.80
Nov 20 – 24, 2019	(Russia) 2019 Russian Grand Prix Stage V, Moscow	2	73.96	4	134.49	3	208.45
Feb 4 – 8, 2020	(Russia) 2020 Russian Junior Championships	10	73.43	14	131.35	14	204.78
Feb 18 – 22, 2020	(Russia) 2020 Russian Grand Prix Final	6	73.81	11	127.05	8	200.86

Results in the 2020–21 season
Date	Event	SP		FS		Total	
Date	Event	P	Score	P	Score	P	Score
Oct 23 – 27, 2020	(Russia) 2020 Russian Grand Prix Stage III, Sochi	2	78.46	2	149.70	2	228.16
Nov 8 – 12, 2020	(Russia) 2020 Russian Grand Prix Stage IV, Kazan	4	73.19	1	168.52	2	241.71
Feb 1 – 5, 2021	(Russia) 2021 Russian Junior Championships	11	74.13	4	153.89	6	228.02
Feb 26 – Mar 2 2021	(Russia) 2021 Russian Grand Prix Final	3	80.37	1	164.60	1	244.97

Results in the 2021–22 season
Date	Event	SP		FS		Total	
Date	Event	P	Score	P	Score	P	Score
Oct 28 – 31, 2021	(Kazakhstan) 2021 Denis Ten Memorial	1	78.96	1	159.92	1	238.88
Jan 18 – 22, 2022	(Russia) 2022 Russian Junior Championships	11	70.67	6	139.62	9	210.29
Feb 26 – Mar 1 2022	(Russia) 2022 Russian Grand Prix Final	2	84.60	1	166.73	1	251.33

Results in the 2022–23 season
Date	Event	SP		FS		Total	
Date	Event	P	Score	P	Score	P	Score
Nov 4 – 7, 2022	(Russia) 2022 Russian Grand Prix Stage III, Kazan	6	76.01	3	162.56	5	238.57
Nov 18 – 21, 2022	(Russia) 2022 Russian Grand Prix Stage V, Samara	3	84.22	3	151.68	3	235.90
Feb 14 –18, 2023	(Russia) 2023 Russian Junior Championships	3	81.98	5	158.47	5	240.45
Mar 3 – 5 2023	(Russia) 2023 Russian Grand Prix Final	4	79.25	10	141.13	10	220.38
