= Pavel Kovalev =

Pavel Kovalev (Russian: Павел/Па́вел Ковалёв) may refer to:

- Pavel "Pasha" Kovalev (born 1980), Russian professional Latin & ballroom dancer
- Pavel Kovalev (figure skater) (born 1992), Russian-French pair skater
