= Minsol Kwon =

South Korean figure skater (born 2009)

Personal information
- Native name: 권민솔
- Other names: Kwon Min-sol
- Born: 18 February 2009 (age 17) Seoul, South Korea
- Home town: Seoul
- Height: 1.56 m (5 ft 1 1/2 in)

Figure skating career
- Country: Canada (since 2025); South Korea (until 2024)
- Discipline: Women's singles
- Coach: Lee Barkell; Jeffrey Buttle; Jessica Wyant
- Skating club: Granite Club
- Began skating: 2015

Medal record
Canadian Championships
Bronze medal – third place	2026 Gatineau	Singles

Minsol Kwon (Korean: 권민솔; born 18 February 2009), also credited in eastern name order as Kwon Min-sol, is a South Korean figure skater that currently represents Canada. She is the 2026 Canadian national bronze medalist.

Representing South Korea, she is a four-time ISU Junior Grand Prix medalist and the 2022 South Korean junior champion. She placed fifth at the 2023 World Junior Championships.

== Personal life ==
Kwon was born on 18 February 2009, in Seoul, South Korea. In addition to figure skating, Kwon has also partaken in rhythmic gymnastics. Upon deciding to represent Canada, she moved to Toronto, Ontario with her mother and brother in 2024, while her father remained in South Korea.

== Career ==
=== Early years ===
Kwon began figure skating in 2014 at the age of six after being inspired by watching Yuna Kim perform at the 2014 Winter Olympics. From 2015 to 2018, Kwon was a flower girl at several international figure skating competitions in South Korea.

She began competing in major domestic competitions during the 2021–22 season and won the national junior gold medal at the 2022 South Korean Championships.

=== 2022–23 season: International junior debut ===
Making her international debut on the Junior Grand Prix at the 2022 JGP Czech Republic in Ostrava, Kwon skated a clean short program. In the free skate, her only error was an unclear edge call on the Lutz in her triple jump combination. She won the silver medal behind Japan's Mao Shimada. Kwon went on to win the bronze medal at her second event, the 2022 JGP Poland II, and qualify for the 2022–23 Junior Grand Prix Final. She finished fifth at the Final.

Kwon finished fifth in her first appearance at the senior South Korean Championships. As a result, she was assigned to the 2023 World Junior Championships, placing sixth in the short program. She set a new personal best score of 128.24 in the free skate, finishing fifth in that segment and rising to fifth place overall. Commenting on the positive reception of her Cats program all season, she added that "I love my program, because I love animals, especially cats. Unfortunately, I don't have my own cat."

Following the season, Kwon switched coaches from Choi Hyung-kyung to Chi Hyun-jung. She spent two months of the off-season training in Canada under Lee Barkell.

=== 2023–24 season ===
In late July, Kwon competed at the 2023 South Korean ISU Junior Grand Prix Qualifiers, winning the silver medal behind Shin Ji-a. Her performances earned her two assignments on the Junior Grand Prix circuit. At the 2023 JGP Austria, Kwon placed eighth in the short program after failing to execute her jump combination, but a second-place free skate lifted her to the bronze medal. At her second event, the 2023 JGP Poland, she won the silver medal.

She then competed at the senior national ranking competition, where she finished fifth overall.

Kwon qualified to the Junior Grand Prix Final for the second consecutive season, where she came sixth. Saying she was happy with her performance, she said her biggest developmental focus was on improving her skating skills, as well as trying to master the triple Axel jump.

At the 2024 South Korean Championships, Kwon would place sixth.

=== 2024–25 season ===
In July 2024, Kwon was noticeably absent from the 2024 South Korean ISU Junior Grand Prix Qualifiers competition and thus did not compete on the Junior Grand Prix circuit. One month later, it was announced that Kwon had relocated to Toronto, Ontario, Canada to train at the Granite Club and that she had been registered to compete in the senior women's category at the 2024 Ontario Sectional Series. Regarding this, Skate Canada put out a statement saying that Kwon had not yet issued a request for release from the Korea Skating Union, making her ineligible to compete 2025 Canadian Championships. She would, however, be allowed to compete in Canadian domestic competitions that were non-qualifying events. Kwon cited that a major factor behind her decision to move and begin competing for Canada was due to wanting to better balance her skating and her studies, something she felt she was unable to do whilst training in and competing for South Korea.

Coached by Lee Barkell, Jeffrey Buttle, and Jessica Wyant, Kwon competed at the October Edition of the 2024 Ontario Sectional Series, winning the silver medal behind Katherine Medland Spence.

=== 2025–26 season: Official switch to Canada and Nationals bronze medal ===
Kwon opened the season by competing at the 2025 Ontario Sectional Series in July, August, and October, winning gold at all three events. In October 2025, it was reported that the Korean Skating Union had released her to compete domestically for Canada, but that she was not yet eligible to represent Canada internationally.

In late November, Kwon finished fourth at the 2025 Skate Canada Challenge. Going on to make her national debut for Canada, Kwon won the bronze medal at the 2026 Canadian Championships. Following the event, she said, "I’m really honoured to get a medal at the Canadian National Championships."

In June, Skate Canada announced that Kwon had officially become eligible to represent Canada internationally. The following month, she was officially named to the Canadian National Figure Skating Team.

== Programs ==
Season	Short program	Free skating	Exhibition
2025–2026	On My Own (from Les Misérables) by Claude-Michel Schönberg performed by Frances Ruffelle choreo. by Jeffrey Buttle; James Bond Medley; Gun Barrel (from No Time to Die) by Hans Zimmer; Los Meurtos Vivos Estan (from Spectre) by Thomas Newman ft. Tambuco; The Name's Bond... James Bond (from Casino Royale) by Nicholas Dodd & Orchestra choreo. by Misha Ge	Invierno Porteño by Astor Piazzolla performed by Gidon Kremer & Kremerata Baltica; Yo Soy María by Astor Piazzolla performed by Fatma Said, Ángel Quintero, Heinrich Köbberling, & Philip Kraus choreo. by Jeffrey Buttle	
2024–2025	James Bond Medley; Gun Barrel (from No Time to Die) by Hans Zimmer; Los Meurtos Vivos Estan (from Spectre) by Thomas Newman ft. Tambuco; The Name's Bond... James Bond (from Casino Royale) by Nicholas Dodd & Orchestra choreo. by Misha Ge	Romeo & Juliet; Wedding Vows; The Cheek of Night; A Thousand Times Good Night; Forbidden Love by Abel Korzeniowski choreo. by Shin Yea-ji	
2023–2024	Tujh Mein Rab Dikhta Hai (from Rab Ne Bana Di Jodi) by Salim–Sulaiman & Shreya Ghoshal; Nagada Sang Dhol (from Goliyon Ki Raasleela Ram-Leela) by Salim–Sulaiman, Shreya Ghoshal, Yash Chopra, & Aditya Chopra choreo. by Shin Yea-ji	Smash by Marc Shaiman & Scott Wittman; Smash!; Let Me Be Your Star performed by Katharine McPhee & Megan Hilty choreo. by Shin Yea-ji	
2022–2023	Danse Macabre by Camille Saint-Saëns performed by Montreal Symphony Orchestra choreo. by Shin Yea-ji	Cats; Macavity: The Mystery Cat performed by Taylor Swift; Beautiful Ghosts performed by Francesca Hayward; Overture by Andrew Lloyd Webber choreo. by Shin Yea-ji	
2021–2022	Caravan by Juan Tizol & Duke Ellington choreo. by Shin Yea-ji	Arrival of the Birds by The Cinematic Orchestra; Head Above Water by Avril Lavigne choreo. by Shin Yea-ji	

== Competitive highlights ==
=== Single skating (for Canada) ===
Competition placements at senior level
Season	2025–26
Canadian Championships	3rd
Skate Canada Challenge	4th

=== Single skating (for South Korea) ===
- JGP – Event of the ISU Junior Grand Prix Series

Competition placements at senior level
Season	2022–23	2023–24
South Korean Championships	5th	6th

Competition placements at junior level
Season	2021–22	2022–23	2023–24
World Junior Championships		5th	
Junior Grand Prix Final		5th	6th
South Korean Championships	1st		
JGP Austria			3rd
JGP Czech Republic		2nd	
JGP Poland		3rd	2nd

== Detailed results ==
ISU personal best scores in the +5/-5 GOE System
Segment	Type	Score	Event
Total	**TSS**	**191.06**	2023 World Junior Championships
Short program	**TSS**	**66.81**	2022 JGP Poland
Short program	TES	38.41	2022 JGP Poland
Short program	PCS	28.56	2023 World Junior Championships
Free skating	**TSS**	**128.24**	2023 World Junior Championships
Free skating	TES	67.72	2022 JGP Czech Republic
Free skating	PCS	62.09	2023 World Junior Championships

=== Senior results (for Canada) ===
Results in the 2025–26 season
Date	Event	SP		FS		Total	
Date	Event	P	Score	P	Score	P	Score
Nov 27–29, 2025	2025 Skate Canada Challenge	2	61.66	6	109.46	4	171.12
Jan 5–11, 2026	(Canada) 2026 Canadian Championships	1	66.51	3	126.67	3	193.18

=== Senior results (for South Korea) ===
2023–24 season
Date	Event	SP	FS	Total
January 4–7, 2024	2024 South Korean Championships	5; 66.01	6; 131.02	6; 197.03
2022–23 season
Date	Event	SP	FS	Total
January 5–8, 2023	2023 South Korean Championships	8; 64.51	4; 131.92	5; 196.43

=== Junior results (for South Korea) ===
Current personal best scores are highlighted in bold.

**2023–24 season**
Date	Event	SP	FS	Total
December 7–10, 2023	2023–24 JGP Final	6; 62.12	6; 120.94	6; 183.06
September 27–30, 2023	2023 JGP Poland	3; 64.00	2; 119.52	2; 183.52
August 30–September 2, 2023	2023 JGP Austria	8; 50.10	2; 115.83	3; 165.93
2022–23 season
Date	Event	SP	FS	Total
February 27–March 5, 2023	2023 World Junior Championships	6; 62.82	5; **128.24**	5; **191.06**
December 8–11, 2022	2022–23 JGP Final	5; 59.91	5; 115.52	5; 175.43
October 5–8, 2022	2022 JGP Poland II	2; **66.81**	4; 119.82	3; 186.63
August 31–September 3, 2022	2022 JGP Czech Republic	2; 62.73	2; 126.64	2; 189.37
2021–22 season
Date	Event	SP	FS	Total
January 7–9, 2022	2022 South Korean Junior Championships	1; 56.89	1; 111.02	1; 167.91
