= Kim Ye-lim =

South Korean figure skater (born 2003)

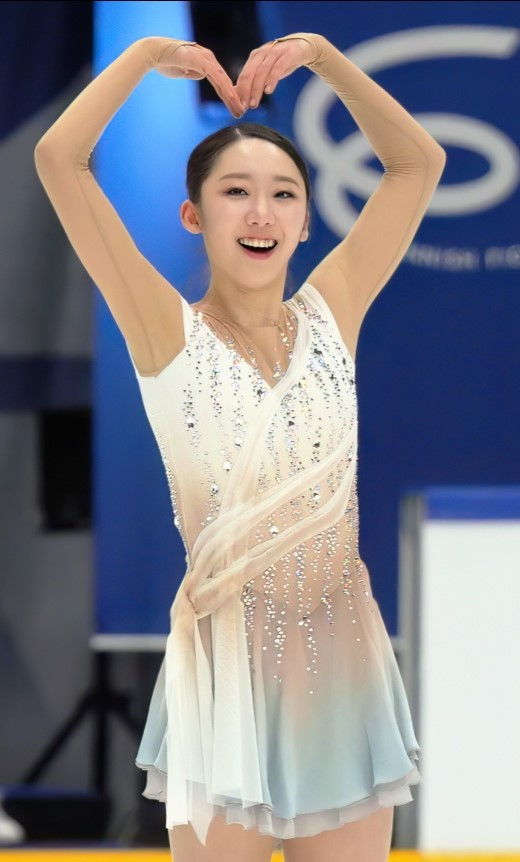
- Kim after finishing her free program at the 2022 CS Finlandia Trophy

Personal information
- Native name: 김예림
- Other names: Kim Ye-rim
- Born: January 23, 2003 (age 23) Gwacheon, Gyeonggi Province, South Korea
- Height: 1.72 m (5 ft 8 in)

Figure skating career
- Country: South Korea
- Began skating: 2010
- Retired: February 14, 2025
Medal record
Figure skating: Women's singles
Representing South Korea
Four Continents Championships
Silver medal – second place	2023 Colorado Springs	Women's singles
Bronze medal – third place	2022 Tallinn	Women's singles
South Korean Championships
Gold medal – first place	2021 Uijeongbu	Women's singles
Silver medal – second place	2017 Gangneung	Women's singles
Silver medal – second place	2022 Uijeongbu	Women's singles
Silver medal – second place	2023 Uijeongbu	Women's singles
Bronze medal – third place	2020 Uijeongbu	Women's singles
World Team Trophy
Silver medal – second place	2023 Tokyo	Team

Kim Ye-lim (Korean: 김예림; born January 23, 2003) is a retired South Korean competitive figure skater. She is a two-time Four Continents medalist (silver in 2023, bronze in 2022), the 2022 NHK Trophy champion, 2022 Grand Prix de France silver medalist, a three-time ISU Challenger Series gold medalist, the 2023 Winter World University Games bronze medalist, and the 2021 South Korean national champion. She represented her country at the 2022 Winter Olympics.

Earlier in her career, she won two silver medals in the ISU Junior Grand Prix series (2018 JGP Lithuania, 2018 JGP Czech Republic).

== Personal life ==
Kim was born on January 23, 2003.

She currently studies International Sports Studies at Dankook University.

She is often nicknamed 'The General of figure skating' by friends and skating fans.

== Career ==
=== Early years ===
Kim began figure skating after being inspired by Yuna Kim's gold medal victory at the 2010 Vancouver Olympics.

=== 2016–2017 season ===
In August 2016, Kim debuted on the Junior Grand Prix (JGP) series in Saint-Gervais-les-Bains, France and placed fourth. In September, she placed fifth at another JGP competition in Yokohama, Japan. At JGP Japan, after Kim was unable to be located for a doping control test in a timely manner, the ISU disciplined her with a reprimand and a warning not to engage in future violations of Anti-Doping protocol. In January 2017, she won a silver medal at the South Korean senior national. She qualified to participate in the 2017 World Junior Championships, but she withdrew because of a toe injury.

=== 2017–2018 season ===
In September 2017, Kim placed fourth at the Junior Grand Prix in Minsk, Belarus. In October, Kim placed sixth at the JGP in Egna, Italy.

After the season ended, Kim changed coaches and training locations. She switched to Tom Zakrajsek and moved to Colorado Springs, Colorado.

=== 2018–2019 season ===
In September 2018, Kim won the silver medal at the Junior Grand Prix in Kaunas, Lithuania, behind Russian figure skater Alexandra Trusova. It was her first JGP medal. The following week, Kim competed in the senior level of the 2018 CS U.S. International Classic, winning the bronze medal. She won her second silver medal at the JGP in Ostrava, Czech Republic, behind Alena Kostornaia of Russia. Her results qualified her for the Junior Grand Prix Final in Vancouver, where she finished sixth after falls in both programs. After the free, she commented: "This first competition is, for me, like a higher level competition. I can see many audiences, and it’s interesting, but I want to have more big competitions like this, so next time I want to show everybody my best program."

Kim placed fifth at the South Korean championships but had fared better at the previous ranking competition and was assigned to her first senior ISU Championship, the 2019 Four Continents Championship. She finished eighth and said that she had enjoyed the experience.

=== 2019–2020 season ===
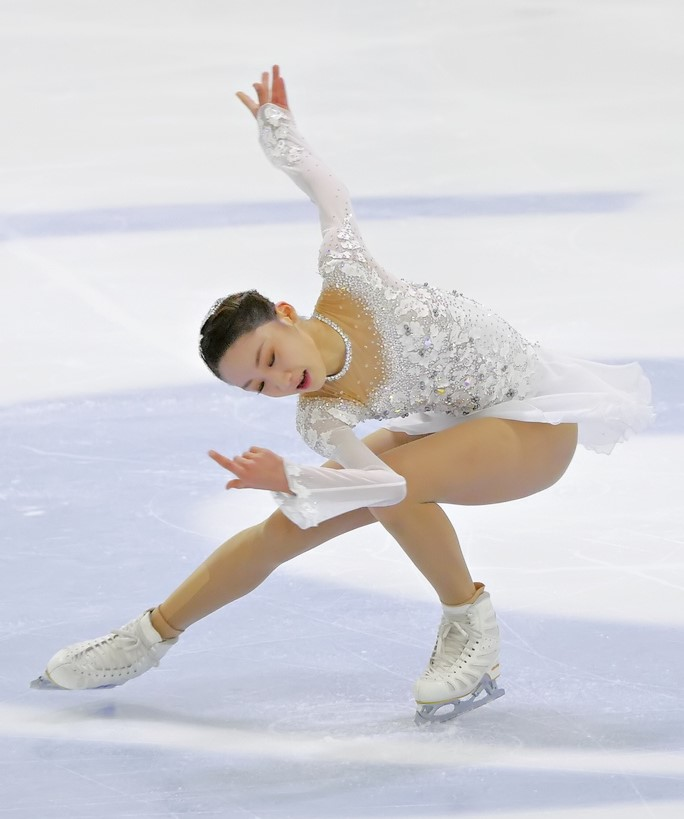
Kim performing a sit spin at the 2019 CS Lombardia Trophy

Kim left coach Tom Zakrajsek and relocated to Korea to train under her former coach, Lee Kyu-hyun. She opened her season at the 2019 CS Lombardia Trophy, placing fourth. A week later, she won the silver medal at the 2019 CS Nebelhorn Trophy. Following these events, Kim made another coaching change, this time electing to train under Shin Hea-sook. Assigned to one Grand Prix event, Kim placed seventh at the 2019 Skate Canada International.

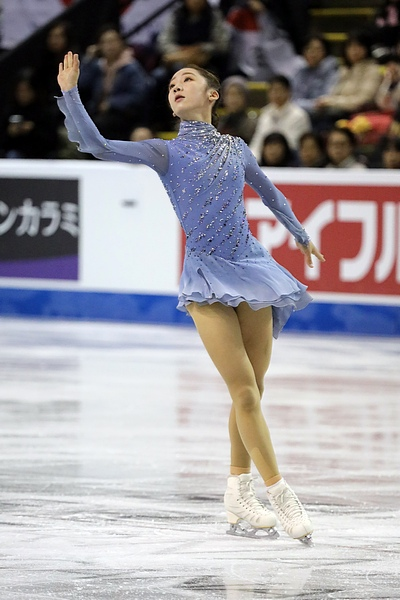
Kim at the 2019 Skate Canada

In December 2019, Kim won the South Korean Trials for the 2020 Four Continents and was subsequently assigned to the event along with country mates Lim Eun-soo and You Young. After winning the bronze medal at the South Korean championships, behind You and the senior-ineligible Lee Hae-in, she was assigned to the 2020 World Championships as well. Kim placed sixth at Four Continents. Her World Championship debut was prevented when they were cancelled as a result of the coronavirus pandemic.

=== 2020–2021 season ===
With the pandemic greatly curtailing international opportunities for Korean skaters, Kim did not compete on either the Challenger or Grand Prix circuits and instead made her competitive debut at the 2021 South Korean Championships. Third in the short program and second in the free skate, she won the gold medal overall, her first national title. She was assigned to one of Korea's two ladies' berths at the 2021 World Championships in Stockholm. Kim placed fifth in the short program with a new personal best, but only thirteenth in the free skate, finishing eleventh overall. Her placement combined with that of Lee Hae-in qualified two Korean ladies' berths for the 2022 Winter Olympics in Beijing.

=== 2021–2022 season ===
Kim made her Olympic season debut at the 2021 Skate America, where she placed eighth. Her second Grand Prix was initially the 2021 Cup of China, but following its cancellation, she was reassigned to the 2021 Gran Premio d'Italia in Turin. She placed sixth at the event.

At the 2022 South Korean Championships, the final qualifying event for the South Korean Olympic team, Kim placed fourth in the short program and second in the free skate, winning the silver medal. As a result, she was named to the Olympics alongside national champion You Young. First assigned to compete at the 2022 Four Continents Championships in Tallinn, Kim won the bronze medal. She placed ahead of You and behind fellow countrywoman Lee Hae-in, achieving a new personal best for her free skate and combined total scores. She expressed satisfaction with her performance in light of the short time that had passed since the national championships.

Competing in the women's event at the 2022 Winter Olympics, Kim placed ninth in the short program. Her history of having been reprimanded by the ISU for accidentally missing a doping test at age 13 also attracted media attention due to the perceived double standard applied by the Court of Arbitration for Sport to Russian competitor Kamila Valieva at the Games. Kim called the decision to allow Valieva to compete "regrettable." She placed eleventh in the free skate, finishing ninth overall. However, her energetic behavior at the Olympics earned her the nickname 'The General of figure skating'.

Kim was assigned to finish her season at the 2022 World Championships, but had to withdraw due to a positive COVID test and was replaced by Lee.

=== 2022–2023 season ===
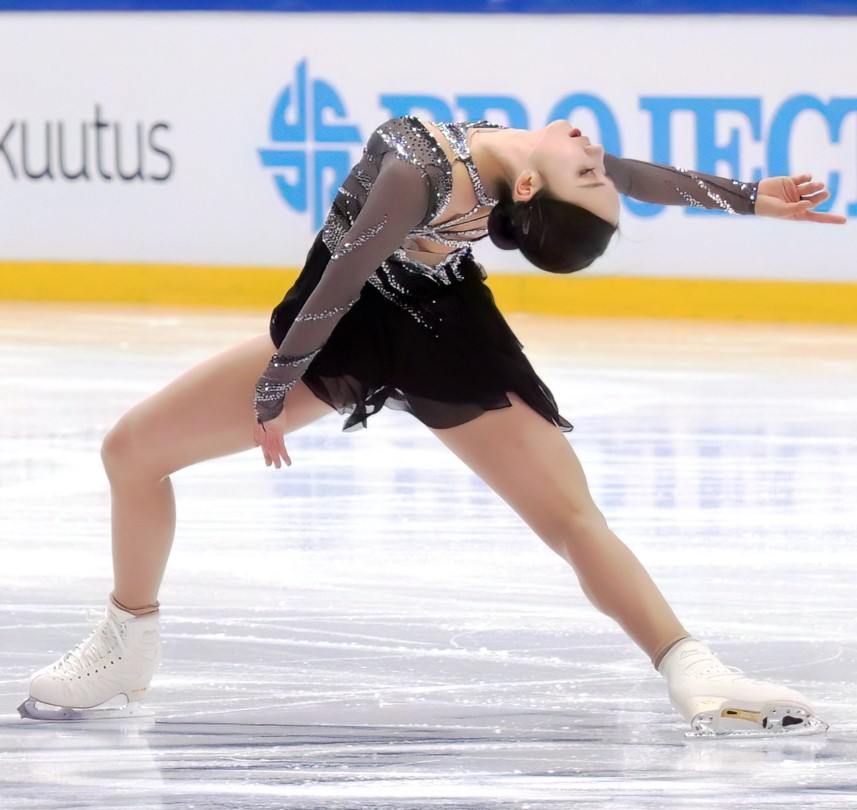
Kim performing her signature Ina Bauer during the short program at the 2022 CS Finlandia Trophy

Kim started her season in mid-September with a win at the 2022 CS U.S. Classic, placing fifth in the short program and first in the free. This was the first time Kim had won a Challenger Series event. She went on to win the 2022 CS Finlandia Trophy as well, with the personal best scores in the free skate and in total.

On the Grand Prix at the 2022 Grand Prix de France, Kim placed second in the short program with a clean skate. She made several mistakes in the free skate but narrowly placed second overall to win the silver medal. That was also her first medal at the Grand Prix circuit. She said afterward she was "disappointed with myself today with the performance I gave, but I am still happy and grateful I won second place." At her second assignment, the 2022 NHK Trophy in Sapporo, Kim placed first in the short program with a score of 72.22 points, unexpectedly finishing ahead of reigning World champion Kaori Sakamoto at the latter's home event. In the free skate, Kim made errors on both triple flip attempts, falling on the second, and finished second in that segment behind Sakamoto but remained first overall by 2.62 points. This was South Korea's first Grand Prix win since Kim Yu-na in 2009. Kim could only say of the victory, "I still can't believe I achieved first place, and I am so, so happy today. I think I'm going to cry!"

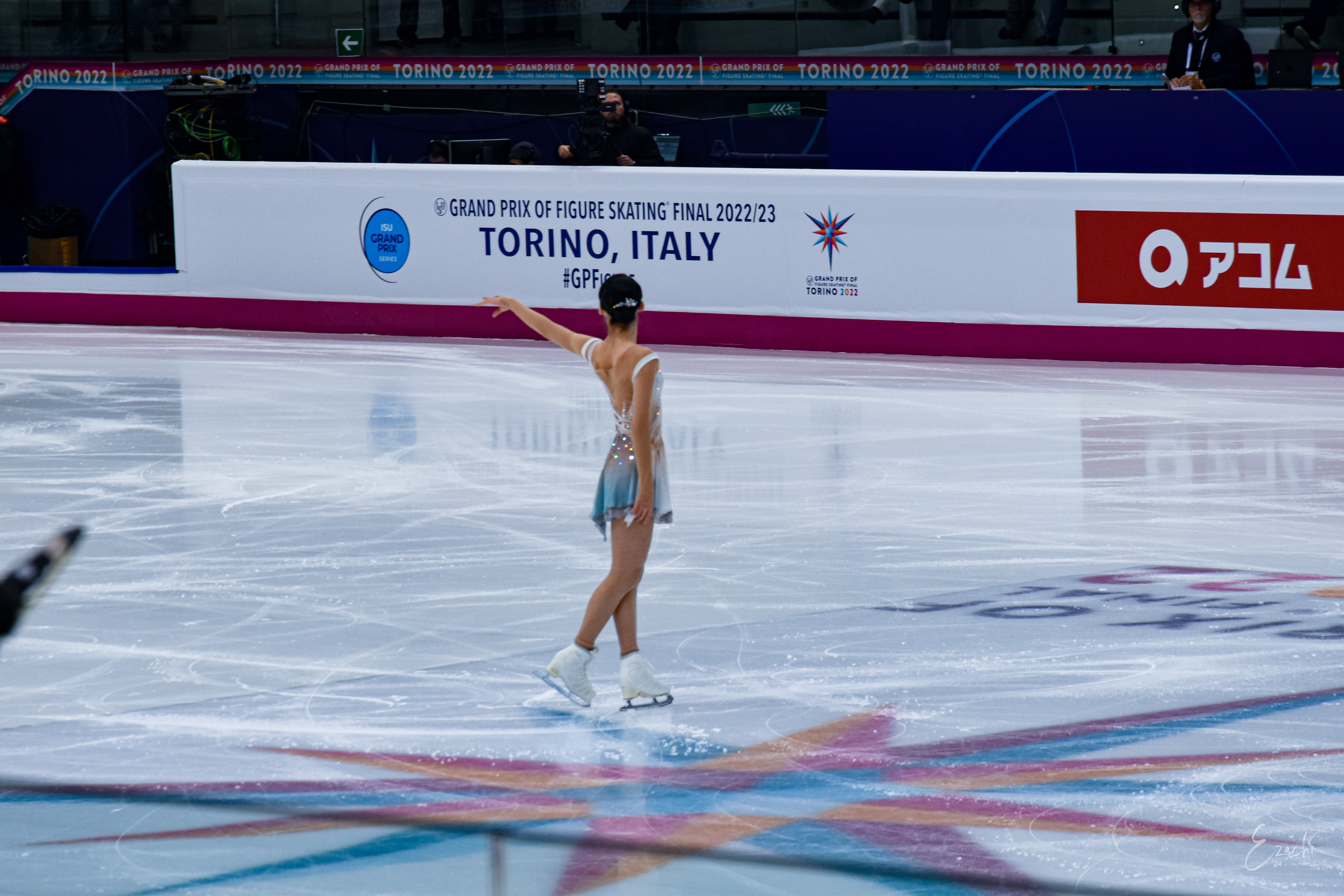
Kim at the 2022–23 Grand Prix Final

Kim's results qualified her for the 2022–23 Grand Prix Final, becoming the first Korean woman to achieve this feat since the earlier Kim. She finished sixth in the short program after singling her planned double Axel and having the second part of her jump combination called on a quarter. She fell once in the free skate and underrotated several other jumps but finished fifth in the segment, remaining sixth overall. Kim said that she was still satisfied to have achieved her goal of qualifying to the Final.

At the 2023 South Korean Championships, Kim won the short program narrowly over Shin Ji-a. Despite a clean skate in the free, she was overtaken in that segment by Shin, and finished with the silver medal. A few days later, Kim traveled to Lake Placid and won the bronze medal at the 2023 Winter World University Games.

In February, Kim competed at the 2023 Four Continents Championships in Colorado Springs. With a clean skate in the short program, she finished first in the segment and won a gold small medal. She noted the high altitude of the site, saying she had been engaged in stamina training for the occasion. In the free skate, Kim underrotated a triple Lutz and doubled her planned final triple jump, a Salchow. Third in the segment, she dropped to second overall, 1.55 points behind champion Lee Hae-in. Kim admitted to being "a little disappointed in myself." Further disappointment came at the 2023 World Championships the following month, where she finished eighteenth. Admitting "I don't know what happened" after the free skate, she nevertheless said that the cheers from the crowd following her performance had lifted her spirits.

South Korea qualified for the World Team Trophy for the first time in the history of the event, and Kim joined Team South Korea for the 2023 edition in Tokyo. She finished seventh in the short program after erring on her jump combination. Rallying in the free skate, she placed third in the segment with a new personal best score, a result Kim said made her "happy and relieved." Team South Korea won the silver medal, becoming only the fifth country to reach the podium at the World Team Trophy.

=== 2023–2024 season ===
Reflecting on her decline in performance during the second half of the previous season, which she attributed to being "already 100% ready for my first competition," Kim decided to adopt a new strategy focused at peaking in the second half, saying "my main goals are the championships events: Four Continents, and especially the World Championships. I aim to leave these events with a smile on my face after my performances."

Before starting the season, Kim left coach, Shin Hea-sook, electing to return to Choi Hyung-kyung, who had coached her as a child. She successfully defended her title at the 2023 CS Finlandia Trophy in her first appearance of the season.

On the Grand Prix, Kim finished sixth at the 2023 Cup of China, struggling with underrotation calls on her jumps in both segments. Kim dealt with equipment issues at the 2023 NHK Trophy, the hook of one of her boots breaking during practice before the short program, which she said made her nervous when performing. She came seventh in both segments, and seventh overall.

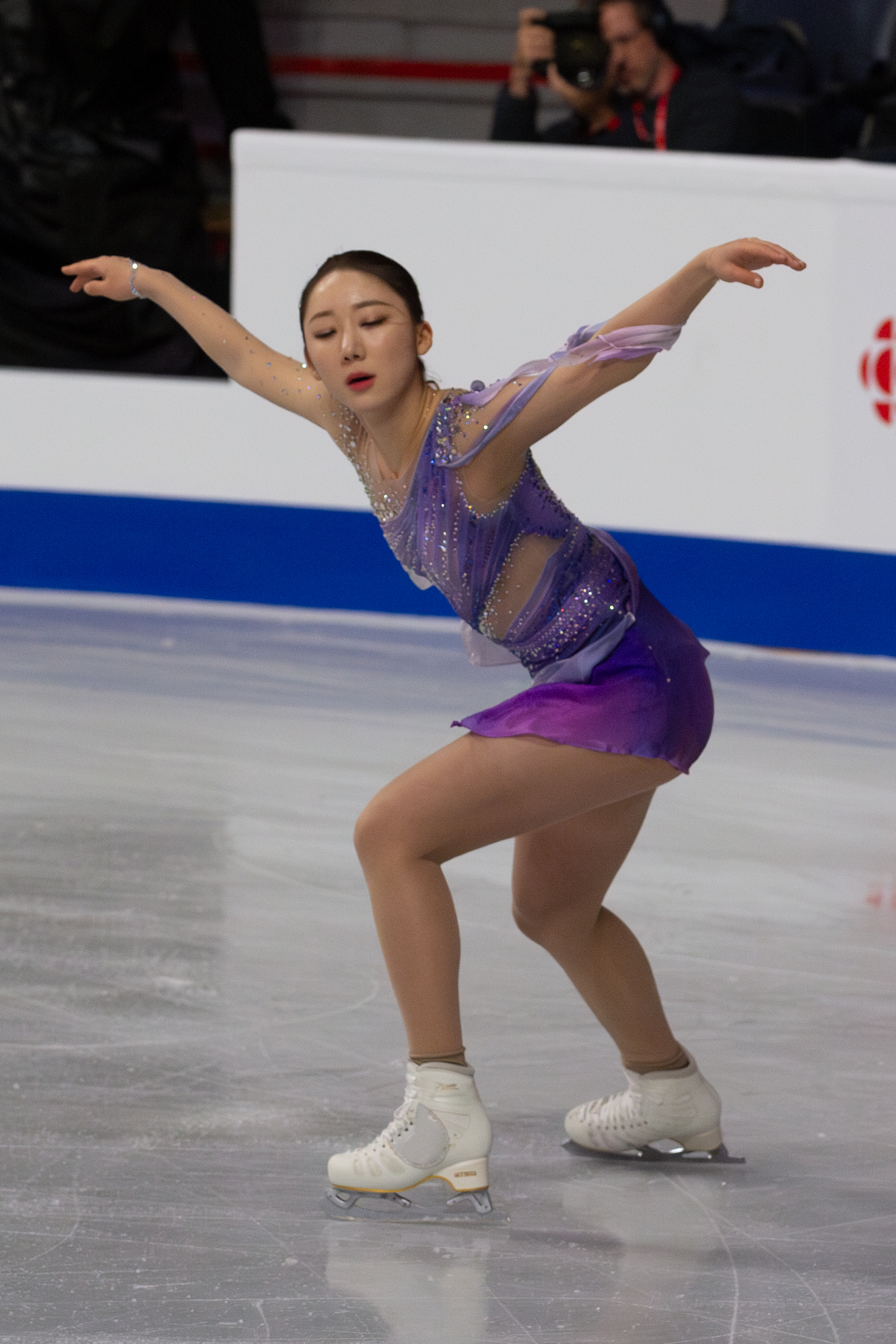
Kim at 2024 Skate Canada International

At the annual national ranking competition, Kim finished in seventeenth-place. She didn't compete at the 2024 South Korean Championships, thus ending her season.

=== 2024–2025 season ===
In early October, Kim competed at the 2024 Korean Universiade and Asian Games Qualifiers. This was her first competition in almost a full year. Although Kim would place eighth at the event, she was ultimately selected to represent South Korea at the 2025 Winter World University Games. Going on to compete on the 2024–25 Grand Prix circuit, Kim finished eighth in the short program at 2024 Skate Canada International but would place twelfth in the free skate after failing to land a single jump cleanly in the free skate, falling to twelfth place overall. She would subsequently finish twelfth at the 2024 NHK Trophy.

Although she was assigned to compete at the annual South Korean Ranking Competition, she withdrew the day of the women's short program due to a back injury she had sustained as early as 2022. According to Kim, she had gone to the hospital only to find that she had sustained a severe herniated disk.

She ultimately withdrew from the 2025 Winter World University Games. In February 2025, Kim announced her retirement from competitive figure skating.

== Programs ==
Season	Short program	Free skating	Exhibition
2024–2025	Ladies in Lavender by Nigel Hess choreo. by Jeffrey Buttle	Je suis malade by Serge Lama performed by Geneviève Leclerc arranged by Karl Hugo and Hugo Chouinard choreo. by David Wilson, Sandra Bezic	
2023–2024	Ladies in Lavender by Nigel Hess choreo. by Jeffrey Buttle	Je suis malade by Serge Lama performed by Geneviève Leclerc arranged by Karl Hugo and Hugo Chouinard choreo. by David Wilson, Sandra Bezic	A Thousand Years by Christina Perri choreo. by Lee June-hyoung
2022–2023	Mercy by Max Richter performed by Hilary Hahn choreo. by David Wilson	Summer of 42 by Michel Legrand; Summer Arabesques by Karl Hugo choreo. by David Wilson	The Good Part by AJR choreo. by Drew Meekins
2021–2022	Liebesträume by Franz Liszt choreo. by Drew Meekins	Violin Fantasy on Puccini's Turandot by Vanessa-Mae choreo. by David Wilson, Catarina Lindgren	
2020–2021	Liebesträume by Franz Liszt choreo. by Drew Meekins	Love Story by Francis Lai choreo. by Jeffrey Buttle	
2019–2020	Black Swan by Clint Mansell choreo. by Lee Kyu-hyun	Love Story by Francis Lai choreo. by Jeffrey Buttle	One Day I'll Fly Away (from Moulin Rouge!) by Joe Sample, Will Jennings choreo. by Lee Kyu-hyun
2018–2019	Love Theme (from Cinema Paradiso) by Andrea Morricone, Ennio Morricone choreo. by David Wilson	Méditation (from Thaïs) by Jules Massenet choreo. by Drew Meekins	Romeo and Juliet (1968 film soundtrack) by Nino Rota; Romeo + Juliet (soundtrack) choreo. by Catarina Lindgren
2017–2018	Memory (from Cats) by Andrew Lloyd Webber choreo. by Lee Kyu-hyun; Riverdance by Bill Whelan choreo. by Lee Kyu-hyun	La La Land by Justin Hurwitz	Audition (The Fools Who Dream) (from La La Land) by Justin Hurwitz performed by Emma Stone
2016–2017	Donde Voy by Tish Hinojosa choreo. by Lee Kyu-hyun	If I Leave (from Empress Myeongseong) by Sumi Jo choreo. by Lee Kyu-hyun	
2015–2016	Donde Voy by Tish Hinojosa choreo. by Lee Kyu-hyun; Eye by Coba choreo. by Shin Yea-ji	The Devil's Violinist by David Garrett; La campanella; Io Ti Penso Amore choreo. by Shin Yea-ji	
2014–2015	Il etait une fois un riche marchand (from Beauty and the Beast)) by Pierre Adenot choreo. by Shin Yea-ji	Journey of Man by Cirque du Soleil choreo. by Shin Yea-ji	
2013–2014	Scheherazade by Nikolai Rimsky-Korsakov performed by Maria Larionoff choreo. by Shin Yea-ji	Rhapsody for Orchestra by Yuzo Toyama performed by Tokyo Metropolitan Symphony Orchestra; Matsuri (from Are You Ready for This?) by DJ YUTO choreo. by Shin Yea-ji	
2012–2013		Scheherazade by Nikolai Rimsky-Korsakov performed by Maria Larionoff choreo. by Shin Yea-ji	

== Records and achievements ==
- Second South Korean junior lady to be qualified for Junior Grand Prix Final, behind Yuna Kim.
- Second South Korean senior lady to be qualified for Grand Prix Final, behind Yuna Kim.
- First South Korean female figure skater to win a Grand Prix event (2022 NHK Trophy), since Yuna Kim in 2009, and second overall.
- First South Korean female figure skater to win a medal at the World University Games.

== Competitive highlights ==
- GP – Event of the ISU Grand Prix Series
- JGP – Event of the ISU Junior Grand Prix Series
- CS – Event of the ISU Challenger Series
- C – Event was cancelled
- WD – Withdrew from event
- Medals at team events are awarded for the team results only. Individual placements at team events are listed in parentheses.

Competition placements at senior level
Season	2014-15	2015-16	2016-17	2017-18	2018-19	2019-20	2020-21	2021-22	2022-23	2023-24	2024-25
Winter Olympics								8th			
World Championships						C	11th	WD	18th		
Four Continents Championships					8th	6th		3rd	2nd		
Grand Prix Final									6th		
South Korean Championships	4th	4th	2nd	6th	5th	3rd	1st	2nd	2nd		
World Team Trophy									2nd (4th)		
GP Cup of China								C		6th	
GP Grand Prix de France									2nd		
GP Italy								6th			
GP NHK Trophy									1st	7th	12th
GP Skate America								8th			
GP Skate Canada						7th					12th
CS Finlandia Trophy									1st	1st	
CS Lombardia Trophy						4th					
CS Nebelhorn Trophy						2nd					
CS U.S. Classic					3rd				1st		
Winter World University Games									3rd		WD

Competition placements at junior level
Season	2016–17	2017-18	2018-19
Junior World Championships	WD		
Junior Grand Prix Final			6th
JGP Belarus		4th	
JGP Cezch Republic			2nd
JGP France	4th		
JGP Italy		6th	
JGP Japan	5th		
JGP Lithuania			2nd
Asian Open	2nd	3rd	

== Detailed results ==
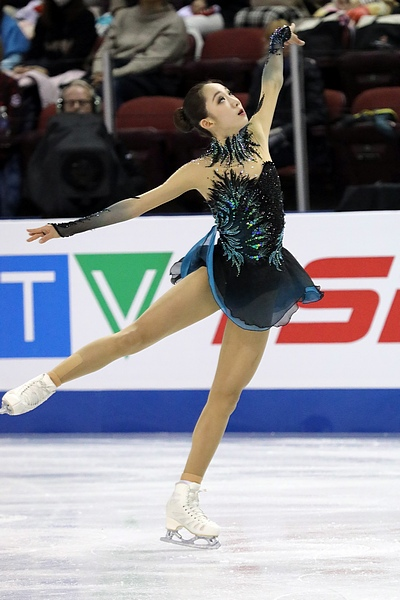
Kim at the 2019 Skate Canada

ISU personal best scores in the +5/-5 GOE System
Segment	Type	Score	Event
Total	**TSS**	**213.97**	2022 CS Finlandia Trophy
Short program	**TSS**	**73.63**	2021 World Championships
Short program	TES	40.68	2018 JGP Czech Republic
Short program	PCS	33.56	2021 World Championships
Free skating	**TSS**	**143.59**	2023 World Team Trophy
Free skating	TES	75.00	2023 World Team Trophy
Free skating	PCS	68.59	2023 World Team Trophy

ISU personal best scores in the +3/-3 GOE System
Segment	Type	Score	Event
Total	**TSS**	**167.64**	2017 JGP Italy
Short program	**TSS**	**56.79**	2017 JGP Belarus
Short program	TES	33.02	2017 JGP Belarus
Short program	PCS	25.01	2017 JGP Italy
Free skating	**TSS**	**115.42**	2017 JGP Italy
Free skating	TES	64.98	2017 JGP Italy
Free skating	PCS	51.20	2016 JGP Japan

=== Senior level ===
- Small medals for the short program and free skating are only awarded at ISU Championships.
- Medals at team events are awarded for the team results only. Individual placements at team events are listed in parentheses.
- ISU Personal Bests highlighted in **bold**.

Results in the 2018–19 season
Date	Event	SP		FS		Total	
Date	Event	P	Score	P	Score	P	Score
Sep 12 – 16, 2018	(United States) 2018 CS U.S. Classic	4	61.30	5	115.35	3	176.65
Jan 11 – 13, 2019	(South Korea) 2019 South Korean Championships	4	63.60	6	109.30	5	172.90
Feb 4 – 10, 2019	(United States) 2019 Four Continents Championships	9	64.42	7	123.51	8	187.93

Results in the 2019–20 season
Date	Event	SP		FS		Total	
Date	Event	P	Score	P	Score	P	Score
Sep 13 – 15, 2019	(Italy) 2019 CS Lombardia Trophy	5	65.65	5	116.95	4	182.60
Sep 25 – 28, 2019	(Germany) 2019 CS Nebelhorn Trophy	2	67.06	2	119.21	2	186.27
Oct 25 – 27, 2019	2019 Skate Canada International	8	61.23	7	115.70	7	176.93
Jan 3 – 5, 2020	(South Korea) 2020 South Korean Championships	3	64.81	3	134.50	3	199.31
Feb 4 – 9, 2020	(South Korea) 2020 Four Continents Championships	7	68.10	4	134.66	6	202.76

Results in the 2020–21 season
Date	Event	SP		FS		Total	
Date	Event	P	Score	P	Score	P	Score
Feb 24 – 26, 2021	(South Korea) 2021 South Korean Championships	3	68.87	2	130.44	1	199.31
Mar 22 – 28, 2021	(Sweden) 2021 World Championships	5	73.63	13	118.15	11	191.78

Results in the 2021–22 season
Date	Event	SP		FS		Total	
Date	Event	P	Score	P	Score	P	Score
Oct 22 – 24, 2021	(United States) 2021 Skate America	6	70.56	8	128.78	8	199.34
Nov 5 – 7, 2021	(Italy) 2021 Gran Premio d'Italia	7	62.78	6	130.72	6	193.50
Jan 7 – 9, 2022	(South Korea) 2022 South Korean Championships	4	67.52	2	140.12	2	207.64
Jan 18 – 23, 2022	(Estonia) 2022 Four Continents Championships	3	68.93	4	140.98	3	209.91
Feb 15 – 17, 2022	(China) 2022 Winter Olympics	8	67.78	10	134.85	8	202.63

Results in the 2022–23 season
Date	Event	SP		FS		Total	
Date	Event	P	Score	P	Score	P	Score
Sep 12 – 15, 2022	(United States) 2022 CS U.S. Classic	5	58.32	1	132.32	1	190.64
Oct 4 – 9, 2022	(Finland) 2022 CS Finlandia Trophy	1	71.88	1	142.09	1	213.97
Nov 4 – 6, 2022	2022 Grand Prix de France	2	68.93	4	125.83	2	194.76
Nov 17 – 20, 2022	(Japan) 2022 NHK Trophy	1	72.22	2	132.27	1	204.49
Dec 8 – 11, 2022	(Italy) 2022-23 Grand Prix Final	6	61.55	5	119.03	6	180.58
Jan 5 – 9, 2023	(South Korea) 2023 South Korean Championships	1	71.59	2	138.69	2	210.28
Jan 13 – 15, 2023	(United States) 2023 Winter World University Games	3	73.73	3	126.43	3	200.16
Feb 7 – 12, 2023	(United States) 2023 Four Continents Championships	1	72.84	3	136.45	2	209.29
Mar 20 – 26, 2023	(Japan) 2023 World Championships	17	60.02	19	114.28	18	174.30
Apr 13 – 16, 2023	(Japan) 2023 World Team Trophy	7	62.65	3	143.59	2 (4)	206.24

Results in the 2023–24 season
Date	Event	SP		FS		Total	
Date	Event	P	Score	P	Score	P	Score
Oct 4 – 8, 2023	(Finland) 2023 CS Finlandia Trophy	1	70.20	3	117.71	1	187.91
Nov 10 – 12, 2023	2023 Cup of China	8	59.56	6	117.12	6	176.68
Nov 24 – 26, 2023	(Japan) 2023 NHK Trophy	7	59.33	7	123.86	7	183.19

Results in the 2024–25 season
Date	Event	SP		FS		Total	
Date	Event	P	Score	P	Score	P	Score
Oct 25 – 27, 2024	(Finland) 2024 Skate Canada International	8	56.12	12	80.02	12	136.14
Nov 8 – 10, 2024	(Japan) 2024 NHK Trophy	12	51.32	11	101.52	12	152.84

=== Junior level ===
Results in the 2014-15 season
Date	Event	SP		FS		Total	
Date	Event	P	Score	P	Score	P	Score
Jan 7 – 9, 2015	(South Korea) 2015 South Korean Championships (Senior)	4	52.99	4	102.83	4	155.82

Results in the 2015-16 season
Date	Event	SP		FS		Total	
Date	Event	P	Score	P	Score	P	Score
Jan 8 – 10, 2016	(South Korea) 2016 South Korean Championships (Senior)	3	59.68	4	113.89	4	173.57

Results in the 2016-17 season
Date	Event	SP		FS		Total	
Date	Event	P	Score	P	Score	P	Score
Aug 4 – 5, 2016	(Philippines) 2016 Asian Open Trophy	1	61.26	2	109.34	2	170.59
Aug 24 – 28, 2016	2016 JGP France	4	55.11	4	102.68	4	157.79
Sep 7 – 11, 2016	2016 JGP Japan	6	52.34	5	113.55	5	165.89
Jan 6 – 8, 2017	(South Korea) 2017 South Korean Championships (Senior)	2	63.98	4	119.29	2	183.27

Results in the 2017-18 season
Date	Event	SP		FS		Total	
Date	Event	P	Score	P	Score	P	Score
Aug 2 – 5, 2017	(Hong Kong) 2017 Asian Open Trophy	2	59.67	3	116.38	3	176.05
Sep 20 – 24, 2017	2017 JGP Belarus	5	56.79	5	106.70	4	163.49
Oct 11 – 14, 2017	2017 JGP Italy	9	52.22	6	115.42	6	167.64
Jan 5 – 7, 2018	(South Korea) 2018 South Korean Championships (Senior)	3	64.53	8	111.49	6	176.02

Results in the 2018-19 season
Date	Event	SP		FS		Total	
Date	Event	P	Score	P	Score	P	Score
Sep 26 – 29, 2018	2018 JGP Lithuania	4	61.63	2	130.26	2	191.89
Oct 9 – 12, 2018	2018 JGP Czech Republic	3	69.45	2	126.89	2	196.34
Dec 6 – 9, 2018	(France) 2018-19 Junior Grand Prix Final	4	62.51	6	115.40	6	177.91
