= Lee Hae-in (figure skater) =

South Korean figure skater (born 2005)

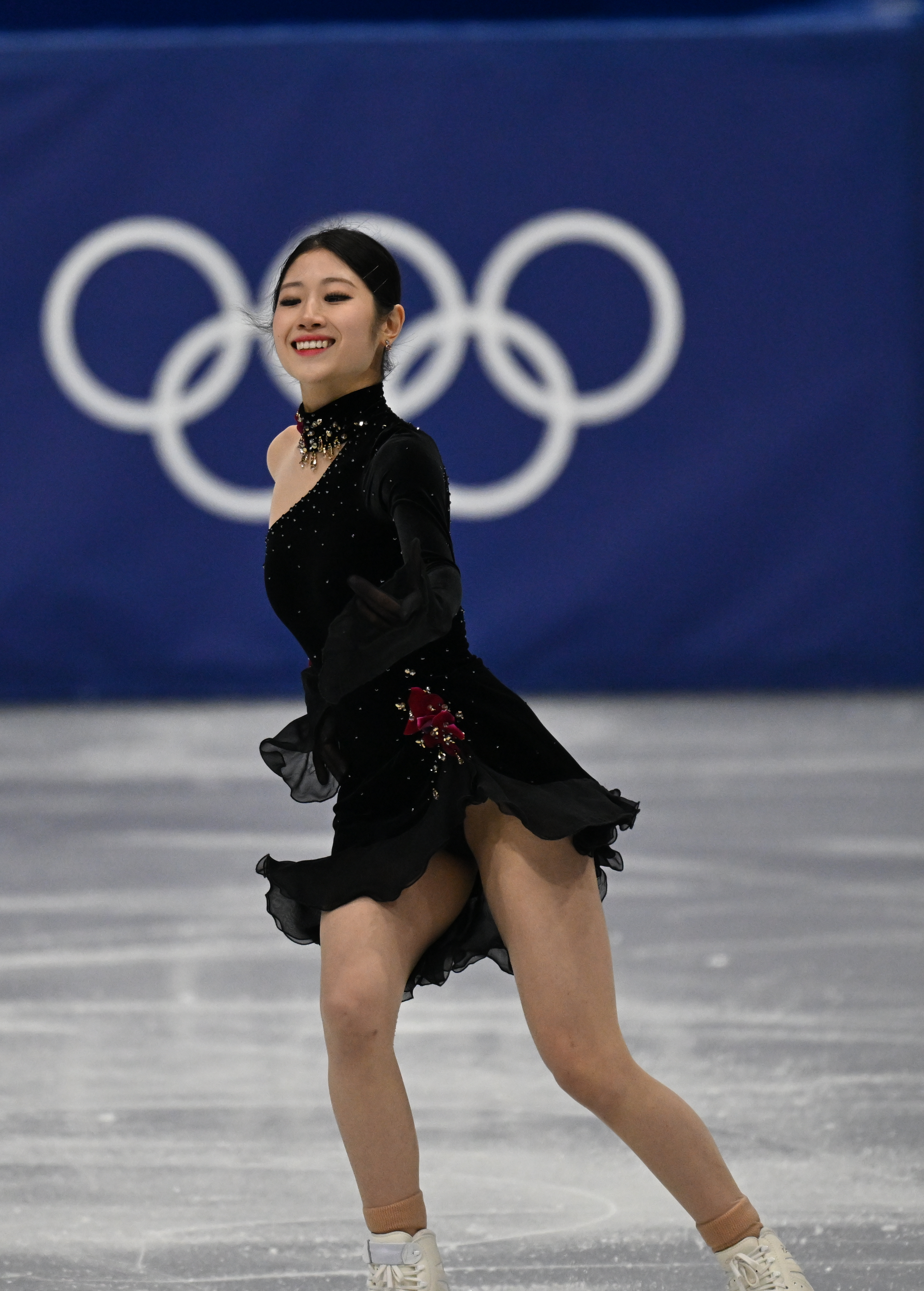
- Lee during her free skate at the 2026 Winter Olympics

Personal information
- Native name: 이해인 (Korean)
- Born: April 16, 2005 (age 21) Yuseong, Daejeon, South Korea
- Home town: Seoul, South Korea
- Education: Korea University
- Height: 1.64 m (5 ft 5 in)

Figure skating career
- Country: South Korea
- Discipline: Women's singles
- Coach: Chi Hyun-Jung; Kim Jin-seo
- Skating club: Korea Skating Union
- Began skating: 2013
- Highest WS: 4th (2022–23)

Medal record
World Championships
Silver medal – second place	2023 Saitama	Singles
Four Continents Championships
Gold medal – first place	2023 Colorado Springs	Singles
Silver medal – second place	2022 Tallinn	Singles
South Korean Championships
Silver medal – second place	2020 Uijeongbu	Singles
Silver medal – second place	2024 Uijeongbu	Singles
Bronze medal – third place	2019 Seoul	Singles
Bronze medal – third place	2021 Uijeongbu	Singles
Bronze medal – third place	2022 Uijeongbu	Singles
Bronze medal – third place	2023 Uijeongbu	Singles
World Team Trophy
Silver medal – second place	2023 Tokyo	Team

Lee Hae-in (Korean: 이해인; born 16 April 2005) is a South Korean figure skater. She is the 2023 World silver medalist, the 2023 Four Continents champion, the 2022 Four Continents silver medalist, the 2026 Cup of China bronze medalist and a six-time South Korean national senior medalist (silver in 2020 and 2024; bronze in 2019, 2021, 2022 and 2023). At the junior level, she is the 2019 JGP Latvia champion and the 2019 JGP Croatia champion.

In the 2022–23 skating season, Lee became the second South Korean woman to win a World Championship medal, as well as the second to be the Four Continents champion, and led South Korea to its first podium at the World Team Trophy.

She represented South Korea at the 2026 Winter Olympics.

== Early life and education ==
Lee was born in Yuseong-gu, Daejeon, South Korea. She has a sister who is four years older than her.

She practiced rhythmic gymnastics as a child before ultimately switching to figure skating. Lee also attended Yangjin Elementary School and transferred from Bangbae Middle School to Hangang Middle School. She graduated from Sehwa Girls' High School in Seoul and is currently attending Korea University, studying International Sports Studies.

She has a pet cat named Jenny.

== Competitive career ==
Lee started skating in 2013 after watching an All That Skate show that was headlined by her figure skating idol, Yuna Kim. Lee also stated that her fascination with the sparkly costumes she would see skaters perform in also factored into her decision to become a figure skater.

=== Junior career ===
==== 2017–2018 season ====
In January 2018, at the 2018 senior South Korean Championships, Lee was 9th.

==== 2018–2019 season: Junior international debut ====
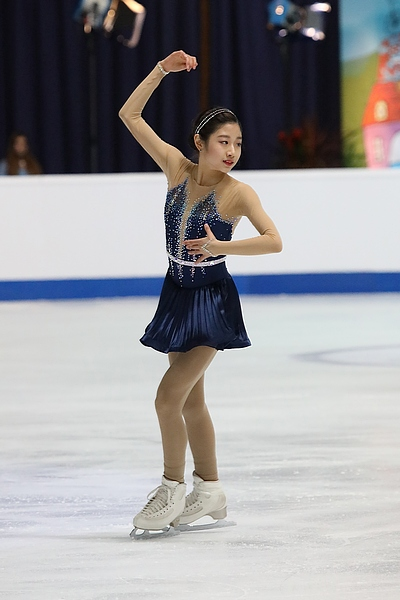
Lee at the 2019 World Junior Championships

In the 2018–2019 season, she debuted in the ISU Junior Grand Prix series. In January 2019, at the 2019 senior South Korean Championships, she won the bronze medal (behind You Young and Lim Eun-soo). In March 2019, Lee (along with You Young) represented South Korea at the 2019 World Junior Championships in Zagreb, Croatia. She ranked fourteenth in the short, which put her in only the third-to-last warm-up group for the free skate. In the free, she placed seventh, rising to eighth overall.

==== 2019–2020 season: Second international junior season ====
In July 2019, Lee Hae-in participated in the ISU Junior Grand Prix Korean qualification competition held in Taeneung, South Korea, where she came in first in the short, free, and overall program. Following the competition, she was selected and assigned to two ISU Junior Grand Prix events, JGP Latvia and JGP Croatia. At JGP Latvia, she became the third Korean woman ever to become an ISU Junior Grand Prix champion, following Yuna Kim and Kim Hae-jin. She finished third in the short program behind Maiia Khromykh and Daria Usacheva of Russia and placed first in the free program to win the event with a combined total of 197.63 points, more than three points ahead of silver medalist Usacheva. She set personal best scores in the short, free, and overall programs. This event marked the first Junior Grand Prix event won by a Korean lady since Kim Hae-jin's victory at JGP Slovenia in 2012. At JGP Croatia, she placed second in the short program with a new personal best, again behind Daria Usacheva. After a strong free skate in which she once again scored a new personal best, she placed first overall with a new personal best overall score of 203.40, more than six points ahead of Usacheva in second and 21 points ahead of Anna Frolova in third. This marked the first time that Lee scored above 200 points in a combined total. With two first-place finishes, Lee qualified for the 2019-20 Junior Grand Prix Final as the third-ranked skater, behind Kamila Valieva of Russia and Alysa Liu of the United States. She was the third Korean lady to ever qualify for the final after Kim Yuna and Kim Ye-lim. Competing at the Junior Grand Prix Final held in Turin, Lee ranked sixth in the short program and rose to fourth in the free skate, finishing fifth overall.

At the 2020 World Junior Championships in Tallinn, Lee earned a small silver medal for the short program behind Kamila Valieva, who took gold, and ahead of Daria Usacheva, who claimed bronze. Lee remarked that she had not expected to be in the top three after the short program, adding, "I'm surprised with the score; it's very high." She also set a new season best for this short program. In the free skate, she fell on a downgraded triple flip attempt, resulting in a sixth-place finish in that segment and ranking fifth overall.

=== Senior career ===
==== 2020–2021 season: Senior international debut ====
With the pandemic greatly curtailing international opportunities for Korean skaters, Lee did not compete on either the Challenger or the Grand Prix circuit and instead made her competitive senior debut at the 2021 South Korean Championships. Placing second in the short program and fourth in the free skate, she won the bronze medal overall. She was assigned to one of Korea's two ladies' berths at the 2021 World Championships in Stockholm due to silver medalist Yun Ah-sun being age-ineligible for international senior competition. Lee placed tenth at the World Championships, which, combined with Kim Ye-lim's eleventh place, qualified two berths for Korean ladies at the 2022 Winter Olympics in Beijing.

==== 2021–2022 season: Four Continents silver ====
Lee made her senior Grand Prix debut at the 2021 Skate Canada International, where she placed seventh. She was tenth at the 2021 Internationaux de France, her second event. At the 2022 South Korean Championships, the final qualification event for the South Korean Olympic team, Lee won the bronze medal, finishing 1.31 points behind silver medalist Kim Ye-lim. As a result, she was not named to one of Korea's two women's berths. All three national medalists were assigned first to compete at the 2022 Four Continents Championships in Tallinn, where Lee placed second in both segments of the competition to take the silver medal, finishing behind Japan's Mai Mihara but ahead of Kim and You Young, the two skaters assigned to the Olympic team. She said that she was "super happy" with the outcome, noting that the event took place in the same arena as the 2020 World Junior Championships, where she had missed the podium due to free skate errors.

Lee was assigned to finish her season at the 2022 World Junior Championships in Sofia. It was later announced that she would not be competing, instead intending to compete at the Triglav Trophy. Following Kim's withdrawal from the 2022 World Championships due to a positive COVID test, Lee was named to replace her. She finished in seventh place.

==== 2022–2023 season: World silver and Four Continents title ====
Lee began the season with two Challenger events, winning the bronze medal at the 2022 CS Nepela Memorial before finishing fourth at the 2022 CS Finlandia Trophy. On the Grand Prix, she finished fourth at both of her Grand Prix events, the 2022 Skate America and 2022 Grand Prix de France. Lee revealed after the second of these that she had been ill during the Grand Prix, impacting her stamina and performance. At the 2023 South Korean Championships, Lee won the bronze medal, earning championship assignments for the second half of the season.

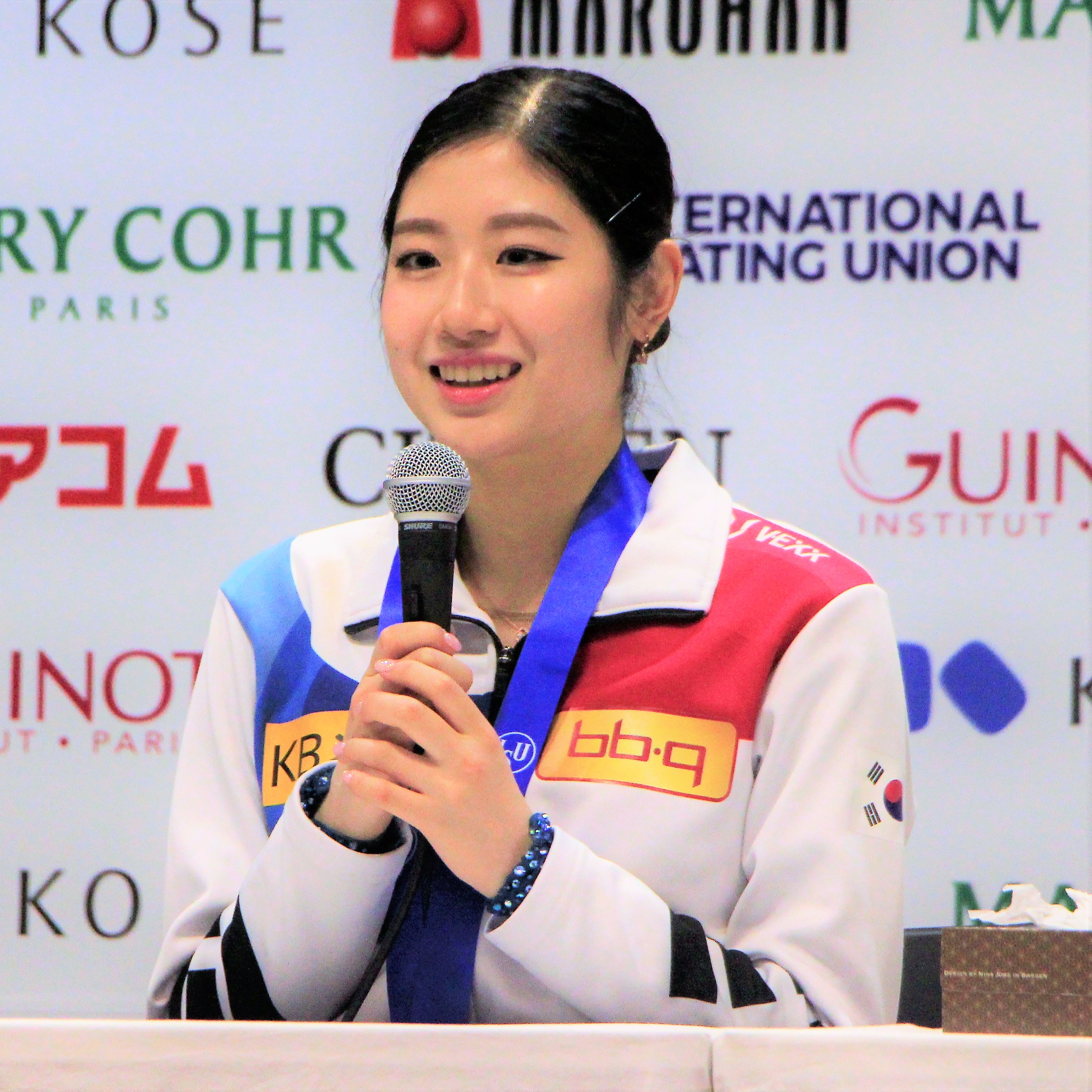
Lee at the 2023 World Championships

At the 2023 Four Continents Championships in Colorado Springs, she was sixth in the short program after her solo triple flip received an edge call and the second half of her jump combination was called a quarter short of rotation. She said afterward, however, that her main "disappointment" was missing a level on her step sequence. In the free skate, Lee executed seven clean triple jumps, vaulting into the lead in the segment and winning the gold medal. She was the second Korean woman to win the title, after Kim Yuna in 2009.

Competing at the 2023 World Championships in Saitama, Lee finished second in the short program with a score of 73.62, more than five points back of segment leader Kaori Sakamoto and narrowly ahead of several other skaters. She reflected that "winning the Four Continents really helped me to get more confidence, but also put some pressure on me." Lee skated cleanly in the free skate, winning the segment with a new personal best score of 147.32. She remained second behind Sakamoto overall, winning the silver medal with a cumulative score of 220.94 and becoming the first South Korean skater to win a World medal since Kim in 2013. She called this "such a huge honor," acknowledging that "the first half of the season was rough for me. I really tried to not give up."

South Korea qualified for the World Team Trophy for the first time in the history of the event, and Lee joined Team South Korea in Tokyo. Lee set a personal best score of 76.90 in the short program, winning the segment over Sakamoto, who fell. Lee won the free skate as well with another new personal best (148.57). Team South Korea won the silver medal overall, with Lee and Cha Jun-hwan being their country's biggest contributors. South Korea became only the fifth country to reach the podium at the event, after the United States, Japan, Russia, and Canada.

==== 2023–2024 season ====
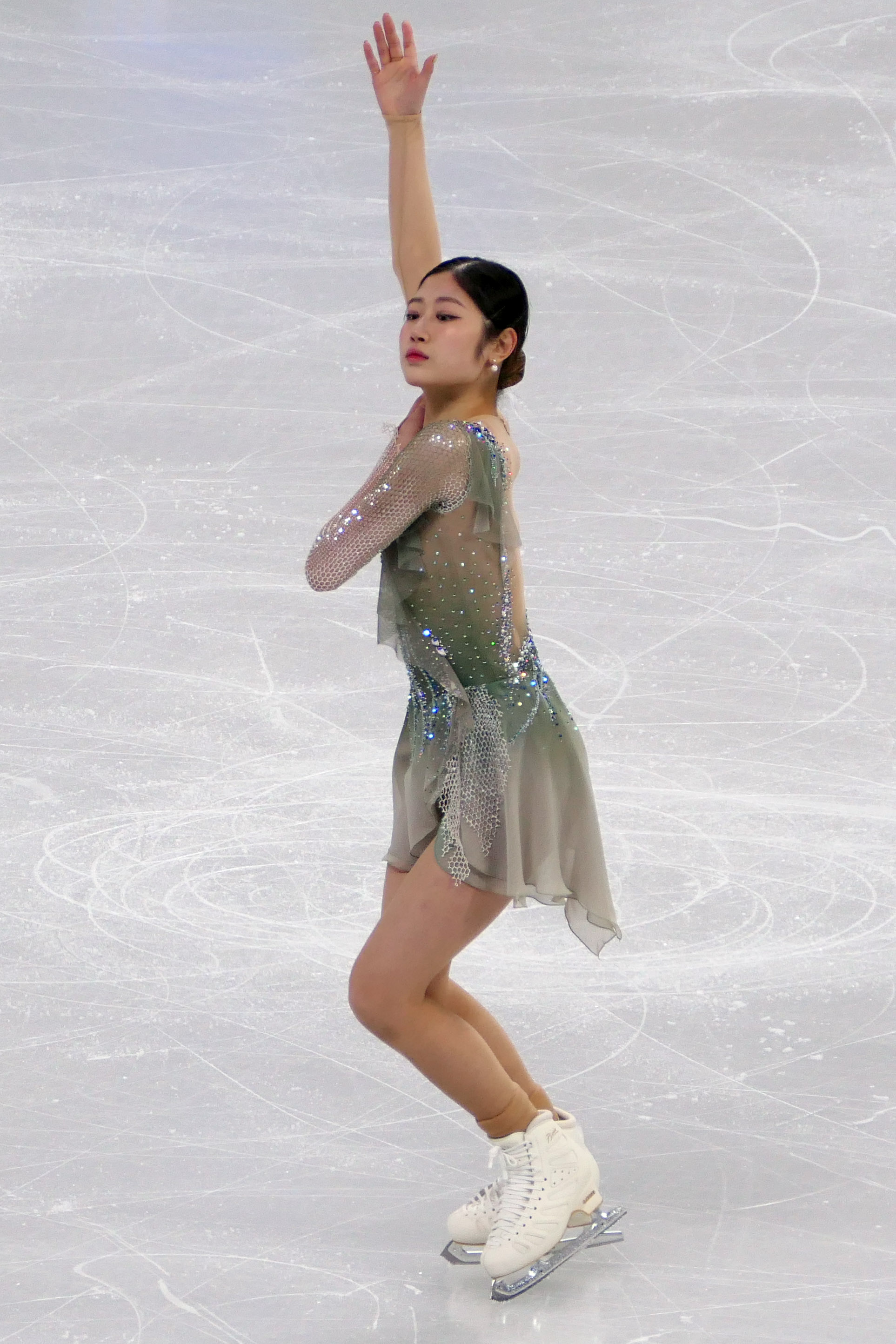
Lee performing her short program at the 2024 World Championships

Lee began the season at the 2023 CS Nepela Memorial, winning the silver medal. She called it a considerable improvement on her showing there the prior year, joking "I didn't fall." She said she was pleased considering she was not yet in peak physical condition. A week later she won another silver medal in an appearance at the Shanghai Trophy.

On the Grand Prix, Lee first appeared at the 2023 Grand Prix de France, where she came third in the short program after receiving quarter or underrotation calls on all of her triple jumps. After several errors in the free skate, she finished fifth in that segment and dropped to fourth overall. At the 2023 NHK Trophy she replicated her earlier result with a third-place finish in the short program and then dropping to fourth due to free skate errors.

Lee claimed her second Korean national silver medal at the 2024 South Korean Championships. Assigned next to the 2024 Four Continents Championships, she entered as the defending champion, but revealed that an incident had occurred just prior to the event that came as a "huge shock." She placed eleventh at the event, having struggled in both segments, but said "the past is the past and I will try to move on."

At the 2024 World Championships in Montreal, Lee skated a clean short program and came third in the segment, earning a bronze small medal. She opined that the "audience gave me so much good energy and that was one of the reasons that I skated well." The free skate proved more difficult, receiving several underrotation calls on her triple jumps, coming twelfth in the segment and dropping to sixth overall. Lee reflected afterward, admitting that "this season it was really hard to believe in myself." She said she needed to work on mental strength for future years.

==== 2024–2025 season: Allegations, temporary suspension, and return to competition ====
In June 2024, Lee received a three-year suspension from the South Korean national team for both drinking alcohol with an adult female roommate, You Young and for allegedly sexually harassing a minor male teammate during an overseas training camp held in Varese, Italy, from May 15–28, 2024. Lee, then nineteen years old, had invited the young male to Lee and You Young's room in the girl's dormitory she was staying at and left a kiss mark on the male's neck. After that, they played together in the room for about 30 minutes, and then the male left the room. The male's kiss mark was discovered by a coach at the training camp the following day, who then filed a report. Although Lee admitted to consuming alcohol, she denied the sexual harassment allegations, stating that she and the young male had previously been in a relationship when she was also a minor in high school and that they had initially ended the relationship due to their parents' opposition. She further stated that she and the male had agreed to rekindle their relationship in secret while at the training camp, making their text message exchanges public to back up these claims. According to the male's side, at this gathering, Lee asked him if he knew what a "kiss mark" was. Male suggested that she apply one, stating that he did not know what it was. At that moment, Lee kissed A's neck, leaving a kiss mark. A claimed that although he had only asked because he did not know what a kiss mark was, he was flustered and surprised to find a mark left on his neck. On the other hand, Lee Hae-in's side emphasized that it was actually the male who first pestered her to apply the kiss mark. They further countered by stating that they possess evidence, such as traces of Lee searching for the term because she did not know what a kiss mark was.

Meanwhile, the young male's legal representative shared that he had begun undergoing psychiatric treatment due to shock from the event that took place. The male testified to the Korea Skating Federation's Sports Ethics Committee that he left the room in surprise after the kiss mark. Subsequently, he received a reprimand for entering the women's dormitory but was otherwise cleared to compete on the 2024–25 Junior Grand Prix series. Additionally, a training instructor was also given a three-month suspension by the Korean Skating Union for "negligent team management". You Young received a one-year suspension for committing acts of 'sexual harassment,' such as taking a photo of Lee Hae-in that caused sexual discomfort and sending it to a male via social media messenger. Lee went on to request an appeal on the suspension, which would leave her unable to compete at the 2026 Winter Olympics, to the Korean Sport & Olympic Committee. However, it was dismissed.

Lee's name was ultimately withdrawn from 2024 Skate America and 2024 NHK Trophy, where she was initially assigned to compete. She was replaced by fellow Korean figure skater, Kim Min-chae, and Austrian figure skater, Olga Mikutina, respectively.

On August 9, Dispatch released an interview with Lee. The interview included the contents of Snapchat conversations between Lee and the Male Player before and after the disciplinary action, as well as the contents of Lee's diary. It also revealed interviews with officials from her agency, All That Sports, Lee's father, Lee's lawyer, and Male's lawyer.

On August 29, Lee appeared before the Korea Sports Council's Sports Ethics Committee for a re-examination to clarify the sexual harassment allegations. Prior to the investigation, she apologized in a media interview for drinking and dating during training camps, but denied the sexual harassment allegations once again. Lee Hae-in's side attached the Snapchat conversation between the two as evidence to the statement of grounds for the request for retrial. This conversation was exchanged on the day after the 'kiss mark' incident (May 24). The investigation lasted approximately one hour. Attorney Kim revealed during the retrial, “The federation exerted so much pressure to prevent us from helping athlete Lee Hae-in that we could not obtain a single petition. I also heard that the federation focused on silencing those involved regarding the manager’s negligence to protect the manager, and encouraged the parents of national team athletes to write petitions.” An ice skating official familiar with the matter stated, “Following this incident, the federation held a meeting with the parents of athletes participating in overseas training and demanded that they campaign to save Manager Choi, an executive of the Skating Federation, and write petitions.” On August 30, after deliberation, the Sports Ethics Committee concluded that Lee Hae-in was guilty of sexual harassment, and consequently, the appeal for reconsideration of her suspension was dismissed. Lee's legal representative, Attorney Kim Ga-ram, stated that opinions were sharply divided among the committee members. In fact, while the results of reconsiderations by the Sports Ethics Committee are usually released on the same day, the reconsideration regarding Lee Hae-in's disciplinary action took more than a day. Although the committee acknowledged the two as lovers and pointed out that Male's statements were inconsistent and kept changing slightly, there was also a strong opinion that the incident must be viewed as sexual harassment. Consequently, the committee dismissed the appeal, giving significant consideration to the victim's age and the overall circumstances. As a result, the three-year suspension of her athletic eligibility remained in effect. Lee Hae-in is reported to have submitted a petition to the Sports Ethics Committee stating that she does not wish for Yoo Young to be punished. But Yoo Young's one-year suspension also remained in effect.

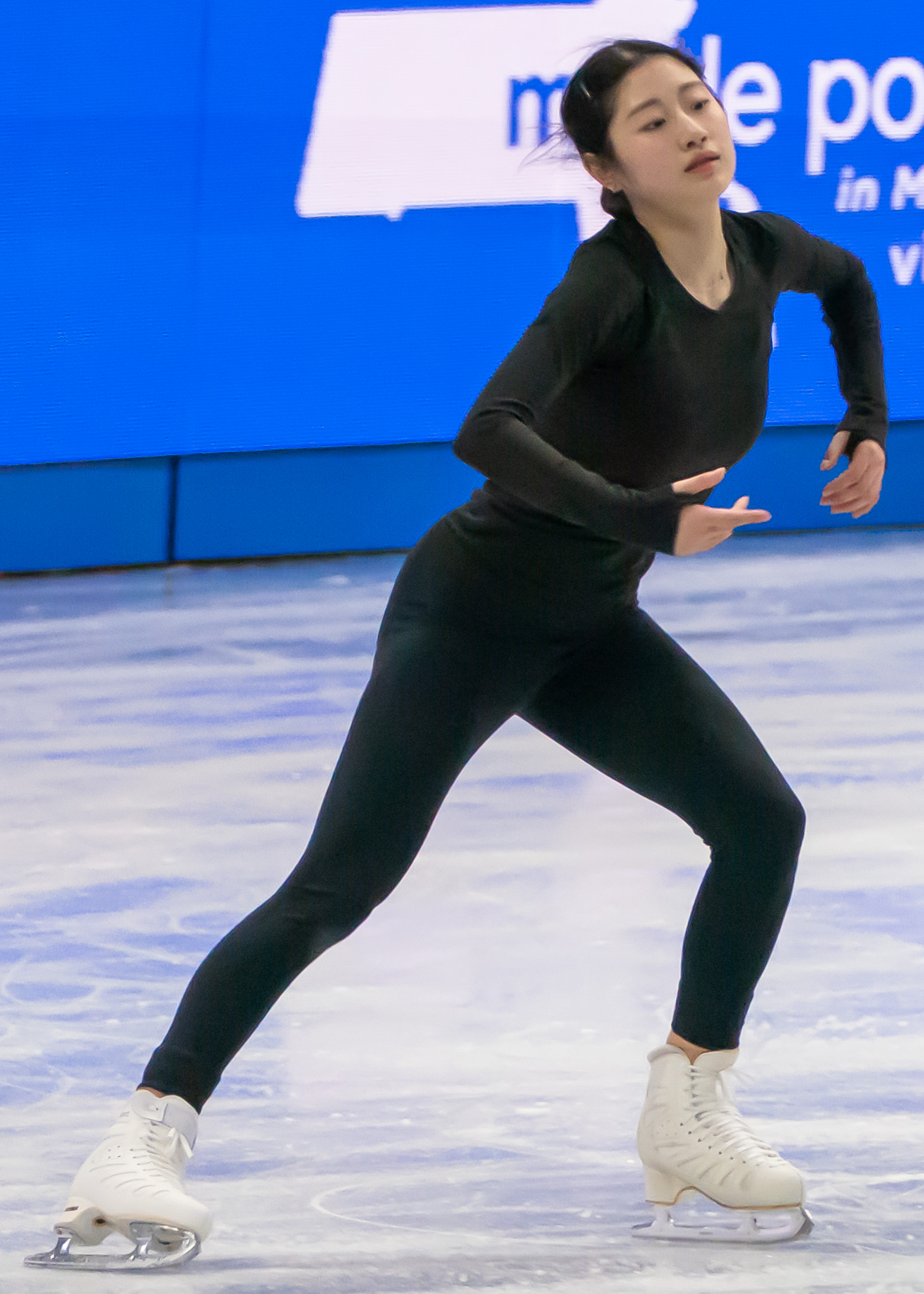
Lee during practice at the 2025 World Championships

Even after the appeal was dismissed, Lee Hae-in maintains the position that the sexual harassment allegations are a false accusation and is considering filing a lawsuit for an injunction to suspend the effect of the decision. In addition, it is reported that Lee submitted a petition to the Court stating that she does not wish for Yoo Young to be punished. Lee clearly stated that she had never been sexually harassed by Yoo Young. In addition, she appealed to the court in part of a lengthy petition, stating, “It is unfair for athlete Yoo Young to lose the opportunity to compete in the Olympics due to a misunderstanding that is contrary to the facts. This will set a wrong precedent for all athletes.” She also introduced her legal representative, lawyer Kim Ga-ram, to Yoo Young. Her suspension and Dispatch interview caused outrage amongst Korean skating fans, even leading to public protests. A truck appeared in front of the National Assembly building in Yeouido. Fans have launched a public opinion campaign after figure skater Lee was effectively sentenced to retirement following a severe three-year suspension. They demanded a full investigation by the Ministry of Culture, Sports and Tourism, claiming that the 19-year-old Lee was branded a sexual offender due to the Korea Skating Federation's inadequate investigation and the Korean Olympic Committee's deference to the situation. In just two days, 1,000 people signed a petition expressing their sympathy for Lee Hae-in's unfair situation.

As a Dispatch article sparked controversy over the male's false statement and the punishment that ended in a reprimand, male, who was identified as the victim, belatedly revealed that they consistently stated during the investigation that they hoped for leniency for Lee. This marks a shift in sentiment compared to their first statement last June, immediately after the Korea Skating Federation's disciplinary action was handed down, in which they drew a line by mentioning things like "I was very flustered and shocked" and "I have started psychiatric treatment." On November 12, 2024, The Seoul Eastern District Court granted Lee Hae-in’s application for an injunction to suspend the effect of her disciplinary action. The court ruled, "'Indecent assault' refers to an act that causes sexual shame or disgust, violates sound sexual moral standards, and infringes upon the victim's sexual freedom; however, the mere fact that an adult engaged in affectionate acts toward a minor under the age of 16 cannot be considered 'indecent assault.' Whether an act constitutes the crime of indecent assault against a minor must be considered comprehensively, taking into account the victim's intent, gender, age, the prior relationship between the perpetrator and the victim, and the circumstances leading to the act. Even if Male was under the age of 16 at the time, Lee Hae-in’s actions cannot be deemed to constitute the crime of statutory indecent assault against a minor as defined in Article 305, Paragraph 2 of the Criminal Act." This judgment, based on the assumption that Lee Hae-in and male player were in a romantic relationship, cited the Criminal Act even though it was a civil trial. Consequently, the disciplinary suspension of Lee Hae-in’s eligibility as a player has been suspended. Following this, it was announced that Lee planned to compete at annual South Korean Ranking Competition, where she would ultimately finish fifth. One month later, Lee competed at the 2025 South Korean Championships, where she finished in sixth place. Due to being the third highest ranking senior-eligible women's skater at the event, she was ultimately named to the 2025 World team.

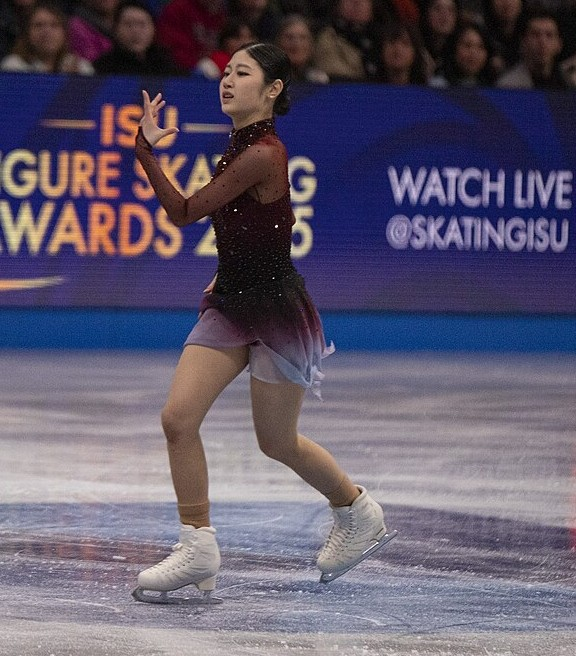
Lee during the free skate at the 2025 World Championships

In late February, Lee competed at the 2025 Four Continents Championships in Seoul, where she ultimately finished in eighth place. The following month, Lee competed at the 2025 World Championships in Boston, Massachusetts, finishing seventh in the short program and tenth in the free skate for an overall rank of ninth, the highest placement of the three South Korean women.

The Korea Skating Federation maintained the position that the disciplinary measures against Lee Hye-in and Yoo Young were justified, even after their application for an injunction to suspend the disciplinary action was accepted. However, the atmosphere changed following the inauguration of the new president, Lee Soo-kyung. On May 13, 2025, Attorney Kim Ga-ram, representing Lee Hye-in and Yoo Young, stated, "Discussions for an amicable resolution were held following the election of the new president. The mediation proposal includes provisions to nullify the existing disciplinary action dated June 20, 2024, and to ensure that even if the Federation imposes disciplinary action again regarding the same matter in the future, the allegations against the two will not be cited as grounds for discipline. Furthermore, in the event of re-disciplinary action, the penalty will be a suspension of four months or less. Since the two had already served the four-month suspension period prior to the injunction case, the disciplinary action was lifted immediately; they accepted the outcome of the injunction application and agreed to the settlement. The two are now able to prepare for the Olympics." By changing its stance following the election of the new president, the Korea Skating Federation established a precedent of overturning its own internal decision through arbitration.

==== 2025–2026 season: Milano Cortina Olympics ====
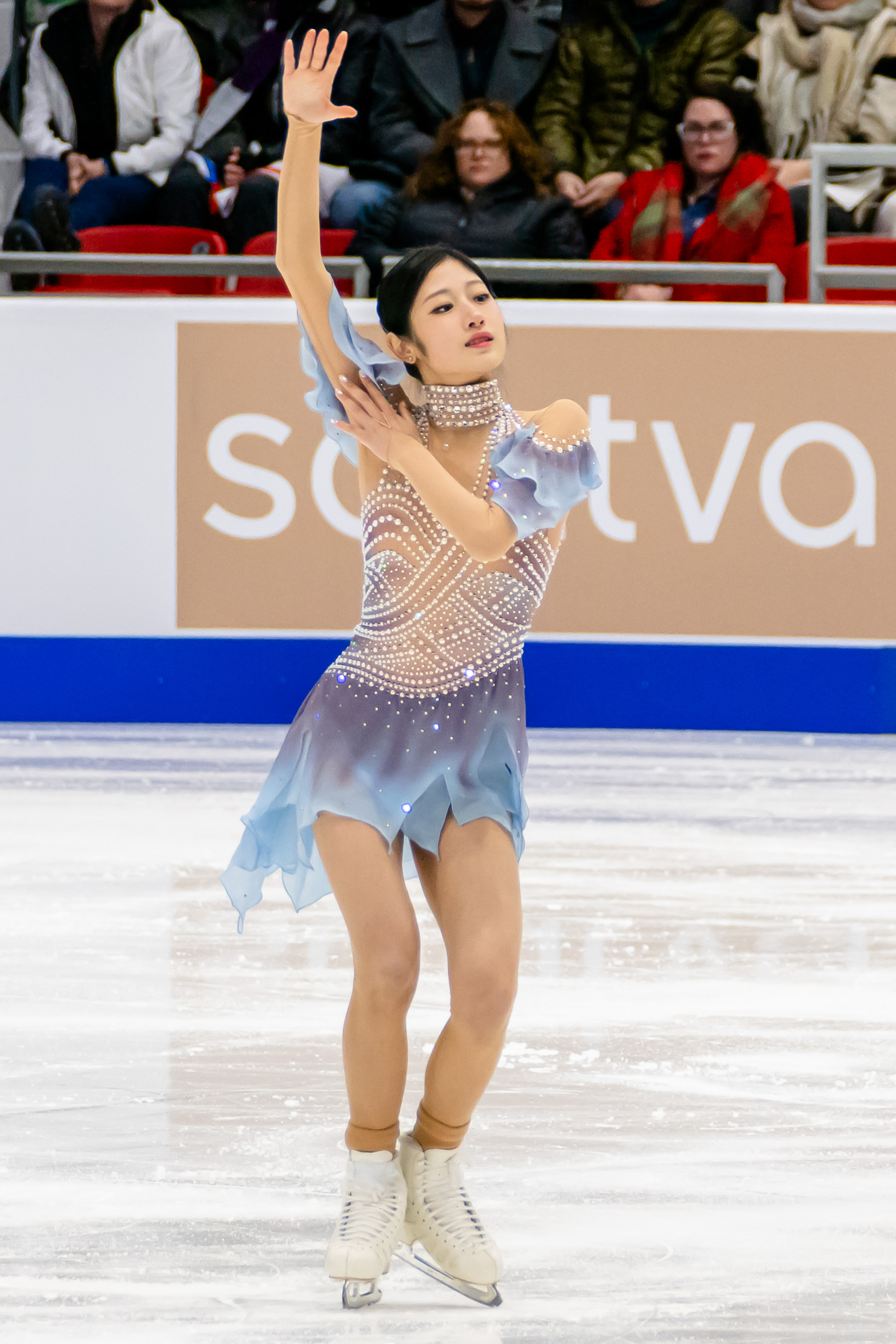
Lee during her short program at 2025 Skate America

Lee began the season by competing on the 2025–26 Challenger Series, placing seventh at the 2025 CS Kinoshita Group Cup, winning gold at the 2025 CS Denis Ten Memorial Challenge, and winning bronze at the 2025 CS Trialeti Trophy. She then competed on the 2025–26 Grand Prix series, placing ninth at the 2025 Cup of China and eighth at 2025 Skate America. The week after the latter event, Lee competed at the annual South Korean Ranking Competition, finishing in fifth place, and was subsequently named to the 2026 Four Continents team.

In January, Lee competed at the 2026 South Korean Championships, placing fifth overall. Following the event, she was named to the 2026 Winter Olympic team. Later that month, Lee competed at the 2026 Four Continents Championships, where she finished fifth. "Being able to participate in this competition, I think it’s a good experience," said Lee after the free skate. "I’m a little bit nervous, but I’m very proud of the results of this competition. I think the atmosphere is very good. Last year for me when I was not good enough, I didn’t skate well. My fans gave me a lot of energy to move on and go forward so I can skate well. I hope I can do my best at the Olympics."

The following month, Lee placed eighth overall at the 2026 Winter Olympics, after setting season's best scores in both the short program and the free skate. "I was so nervous today, even more than the short program," she said after her free skate. "Right before my performance, my coach told me, ‘We’ll worry for you, so you don’t have to worry yourself. You just have to enjoy your performance."

At the 2026 World Championships in March, Lee placed tenth in the short program but dropped to sixteenth in the free skate, finishing thirteenth overall.

In an interview in June, Lee reflected on the challenges she faced leading up to the 2026 Winter Olympics, stating that "the most important mindset was telling myself, 'Let's do what I can do today and not give up.'"

==== 2026-2027 season ====
Lee began her season at the 2026 Nepela Memorial, where she placed second in both segments to win the silver medal behind Kim Yu-seong. In the free skate, she landed her triple Axel, albeit underrotated.

She was sixth after the short program at the 2026 Cup of China after popping a triple Lutz. In the free skate, she landed her first ratified triple Axel, placing third in that segment and winning the bronze medal overall. “I’m so happy that I landed my triple Axel!” she said. “I was a little bit under pressure in free skate because there’s a mistake on my short program. I already attempted my triple Axel during the Olympics, and I worked even harder on it this summer. It was a big challenge for me, but now I made it. I still need to keep working on my consistency.” In another interview, she said, "Honestly, after last season ended, I didn't have a clear motivation...this time, I really wanted to [land the triple Axel]. Since everyone is helping me, I felt I needed to become stronger."

Lee later competed at 2026 Finlandia Trophy, placing fifth. “I wasn't expecting to qualify for the Grand Prix Final,” she said. “Winning my first-ever Grand Prix medal was already an incredible experience for me, and I'd achieved my goal for the season. I wanted to do my best here, but it didn't quite work out. That's okay, though. I have another competition coming up, and I'll keep working hard.”

== Records and achievements ==
- Third South Korean skater to win a Junior Grand Prix title, following Yuna Kim and Kim Hae-jin
- Second South Korean skater to win two Junior Grand Prix titles in one season, following Yuna Kim in 2005
- Third South Korean woman to exceed 200 points in total, following Yuna Kim and Lim Eun-soo
- Second South Korean skater to medal and win the Four Continents Figure Skating Championships, following Yuna Kim in 2009
- Second South Korean skater to medal at Worlds, following Yuna Kim in 2007

== Programs ==
Season	Short program	Free skating	Exhibition
2026–2027	Experience by Ludovico Einaudi choreo. by Benoît Richaud	The Great Gatsby; Buchanan Mansion and Daisy Suite; Magic Tree and I Let Myself Go; Hotel Sayre by Craig Armstrong performed by Lana Del Rey arranged by Karl Hugo choreo. by Shin Yea-ji	Five Nights at Freddy's by The Newton Brothers choreo. by Cha Jun-hwan
2025–2026	Seirenes - "Sirens" by Anonymous 4 & Christopher Tin; Haktan Gelen Şerbati - "The Drink from God" by Kardeş Türküler & Christopher Tin choreo. by Lori Nichol, Carolina Kostner; My Way by Paul Anka performed by Sydnie Christmas choreo. by Misha Ge	Carmen Suite No. 1 by Georges Bizet performed by Ernest Guiraud choreo. by Misha Ge; Notre Dame de Paris by Riccardo Cocciante & Luc Plamondon; Les Sans-papiers performed by Luck Mervil; Vivre performed by Hélène Ségara; Danse mon Esmeralda performed by Garou choreo. by Shae-Lynn Bourne	KPop Demon Hunters; Your Idol by Saja Boys; What It Sounds Like by Huntrix choreo. by Shin Yea-ji
2024–2025	Ave Maria by Franz Schubert performed by Helene Fischer choreo. by Shin Yea-ji; XO; End of Time by Beyoncé choreo. by Ivan Righini	Ark Ascending; Without You by Ursine Vulpine & Annaca choreo. by Shin Yea-ji	Homage to Korea by Ji Pyeong Kwon choreo. by Shin Yea-ji; Fernando by ABBA; Why Don't You Do Right? by Kansas Joe McCoy performed by Amy Irving; Bei Mir Bistu Shein by Jacob Jacobs and Sholom Secunda performed by Ella Fitzgerald
2023–2024	Seirenes - "Sirens" by Anonymous 4 & Christopher Tin; Haktan Gelen Şerbati - "The Drink from God" by Kardeş Türküler & Christopher Tin choreo. by Lori Nichol, Carolina Kostner; Why Don't You Do Right? by Kansas Joe McCoy performed by Amy Irving; Bei Mir Bistu Shein by Jacob Jacobs and Sholom Secunda performed by Ella Fitzgerald	Notre Dame de Paris by Riccardo Cocciante & Luc Plamondon; Les Sans-papiers performed by Luck Mervil; Vivre performed by Hélène Ségara; Danse mon Esmeralda performed by Garou choreo. by Shae-Lynn Bourne	Gravity by Sara Bareilles choreo. by Joey Russell; Pink Venom by Blackpink choreo. by Misha Ge
2022–2023	Storm by Eric Radford choreo. by Tom Dickson	The Phantom of the Opera; Down Once More/Track Down This Murderer; Phantasia; Wishing You Were Somehow Here Again performed by Emmy Rossum; Masquerade by Andrew Lloyd Webber, Charles Hart, Richard Stilgoe & Julian Lloyd Webber choreo. by Shae-Lynn Bourne	Never Enough (from The Greatest Showman) performed by Loren Allred choreo. by Scott Brown, Alex Chang; After Like by IVE; Ave Maria by Franz Schubert performed by Helene Fischer choreo. by Shin Yea-ji; Rollin' by BB Girls
2021–2022	Ave Maria by Franz Schubert performed by Helene Fischer choreo. by Shin Yea-ji	Homage to Korea by Ji Pyeong Kwon choreo. by Shin Yea-ji	Rollin' by BB Girls
2020–2021	Ave Maria by Franz Schubert performed by Helene Fischer choreo. by Shin Yea-ji	Black Swan; Nina's Dream; Stumbled Beginnings; A Swan Is Born; Perfection by Clint Mansell choreo. by Shin Yea-ji	
2019–2020	Nocturne no. 20 in C-Sharp minor by Frédéric Chopin choreo. by Scott Brown	Firedance (from Riverdance) by Bill Whelan choreo. by Shin Yea-ji	I Wanna Dance with Somebody (from Isn't It Romantic) performed by Priyanka Chopra; Never Enough (from The Greatest Showman) performed by Loren Allred choreo. by Scott Brown and Alex Chang
2018–2019	Never Enough (from The Greatest Showman) performed by Loren Allred choreo. by Scott Brown and Alex Chang	West Side Story by Leonard Bernstein choreo. by Scott Brown, Alex Chang	Gold by Jessie J performed by Sofia Karlberg choreo. by Shin Yea-ji
2017–2018	Stranger in Paradise by Sarah Brightman	Paramour (from Cirque du Soleil) by Guy Dubuc and Marc Lessard choreo. by Shin Yea-ji	
2016–2017	Polovtsian Dances by Alexander Borodin	Jupiter Ascending by Michael Giacchino	
2015–2016		Modern Times by Charlie Chaplin	
2014–2015		Modern Times by Charlie Chaplin	

== Competitive highlights ==
- GP – Event of the ISU Grand Prix Series
- JGP – Event of the ISU Junior Grand Prix Series
- CS – Event of the ISU Challenger Series
- TBD – Assigned
- WD – Withdrew from competition
- Medals at team events are awarded for the team results only. Individual placements at team events are listed in parentheses.

Competition placements at senior level
Season	2017–18	2018–19	2019–20	2020–21	2021–22	2022–23	2023–24	2024–25	2025–26	2026–27
Winter Olympics									8th	
World Championships				10th	7th	2nd	6th	9th	13th	
Four Continents Championships					2nd	1st	11th	8th	5th	
South Korean Championships	9th	3rd	2nd	3rd	3rd	3rd	2nd	6th	5th	
World Team Trophy						2nd (1st)				
GP Cup of China									9th	3rd
GP Finland										5th
GP France					10th	4th	4th			
GP NHK Trophy							4th			
GP Skate America						4th			8th	
GP Skate Canada					7th					
CS Denis Ten Memorial									1st	
CS Finlandia Trophy						4th				
CS Kinoshita Group Cup									7th	
CS Nepela Memorial						3rd	2nd			2nd
CS Trialeti Trophy									3rd	
Egna Spring Trophy					2nd					
Shanghai Trophy							2nd			
Triglav Trophy					1st					

Competition placements at junior level
Season	2018–19	2019–20
World Junior Championships	8th	5th
Junior Grand Prix Final		5th
JGP Austria	4th	
JGP Croatia		1st
JGP Latvia		1st
JGP Slovenia	3rd	
Asian Open Trophy	1st	
Children of Asia Games	5th	

== Detailed results ==
ISU personal best scores in the +5/-5 GOE System
Segment	Type	Score	Event
Total	TSS	225.47	2023 World Team Trophy
Short program	TSS	76.90	2023 World Team Trophy
Short program	TES	41.00	2023 World Team Trophy
Short program	PCS	35.90	2023 World Team Trophy
Free skating	TSS	148.57	2023 World Team Trophy
Free skating	TES	76.42	2022 Four Continents Championships
Free skating	PCS	72.46	2023 World Team Trophy

- Small medals for the short program and free skating are only awarded at ISU Championships.

=== Senior level ===
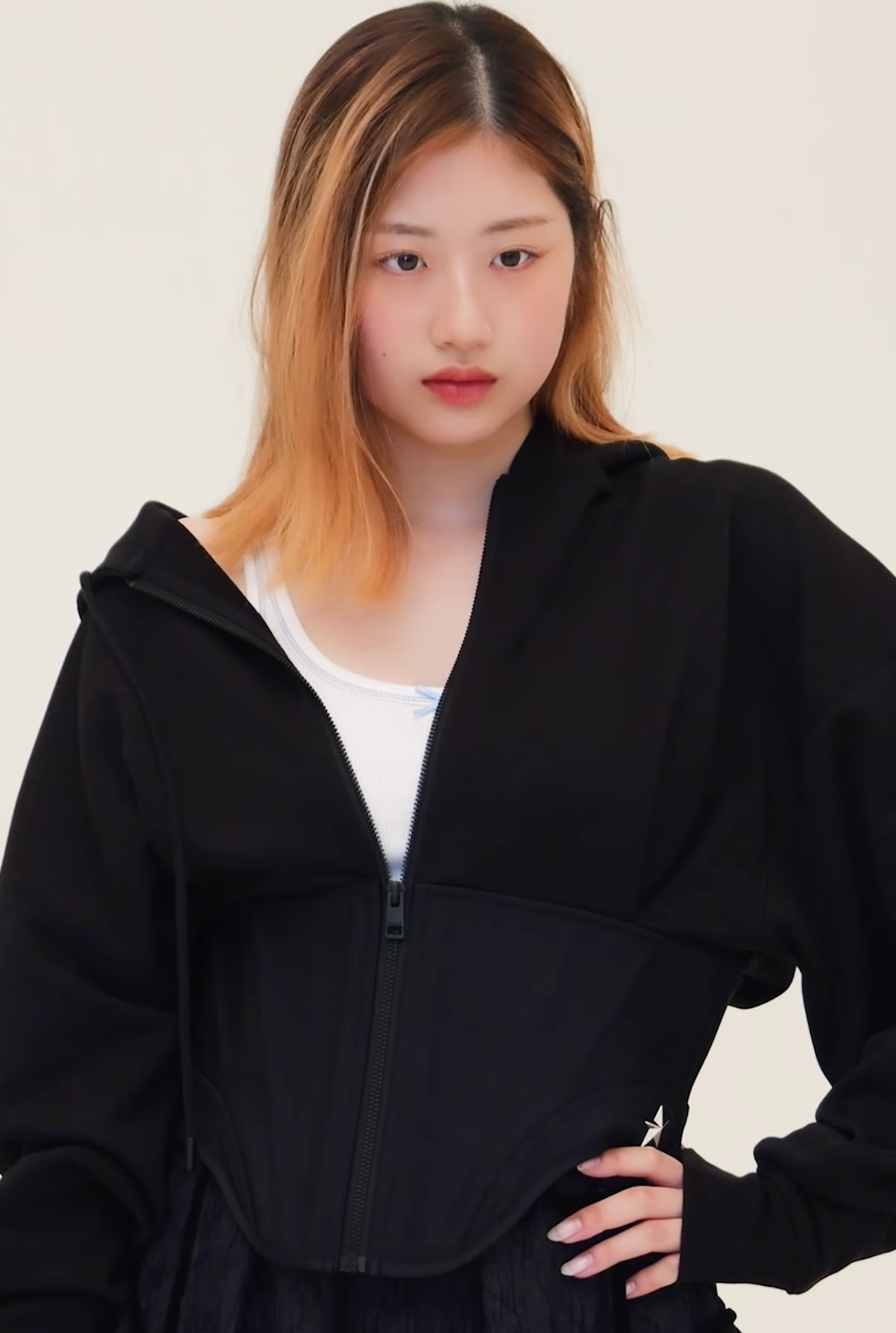
Lee in 2023.

Results in the 2017–18 season
Date	Event	SP		FS		Total	
Date	Event	P	Score	P	Score	P	Score
Jan 5–7, 2018	(South Korea) 2018 South Korean Championships	7	57.64	10	107.60	9	165.24

Results in the 2018–19 season
Date	Event	SP		FS		Total	
Date	Event	P	Score	P	Score	P	Score
Jan 11–13, 2019	(South Korea) 2019 South Korean Championships	3	63.66	3	124.07	3	187.73

Results in the 2019–20 season
Date	Event	SP		FS		Total	
Date	Event	P	Score	P	Score	P	Score
Jan 3–5, 2020	(South Korea) 2020 South Korean Championships	2	68.20	2	136.36	2	204.56

Results in the 2020–21 season
Date	Event	SP		FS		Total	
Date	Event	P	Score	P	Score	P	Score
Feb 24–26, 2021	(South Korea) 2021 South Korean Championships	2	69.22	4	126.18	3	195.40
Mar 22–28, 2021	(Sweden) 2021 World Championships	8	68.94	11	124.50	10	193.44

Results in the 2021–22 season
Date	Event	SP		FS		Total	
Date	Event	P	Score	P	Score	P	Score
Oct 29–31, 2021	2021 Skate Canada International	8	62.63	8	127.37	7	190.00
Nov 19–21, 2021	2021 Internationaux de France	8	63.18	10	108.14	10	171.32
Jan 7–9, 2022	(South Korea) 2022 South Korean Championships	3	68.63	3	137.70	3	206.33
Jan 18–23, 2022	(Estonia) 2022 Four Continents Championships	2	69.97	2	143.55	2	213.52
Mar 22–28, 2022	(France) 2022 World Championships	11	64.16	7	132.39	7	196.55
Apr 7–10, 2022	(Italy) 2022 Egna Spring Trophy	3	60.99	2	121.33	2	182.32
Apr 13–17, 2022	(Slovenia) 2022 Triglav Trophy	1	65.91	1	110.24	1	176.15

Results in the 2022–23 season
Date	Event	SP		FS		Total	
Date	Event	P	Score	P	Score	P	Score
Sep 29 – Oct 1, 2022	(Slovakia) 2022 CS Nepela Memorial	2	58.06	3	106.82	3	164.88
Oct 4–9, 2022	(Finland) 2022 CS Finlandia Trophy	4	66.00	3	129.72	4	195.72
Oct 21–23, 2022	(United States) 2022 Skate America	4	66.24	5	113.26	4	179.50
Nov 4–6, 2022	2022 Grand Prix de France	6	62.77	2	130.72	4	193.49
Jan 5–8, 2023	(South Korea) 2023 South Korean Championships	3	70.75	3	134.56	3	205.31
Feb 7–12, 2023	(United States) 2023 Four Continents Championships	6	69.13	1	141.71	1	210.84
Mar 20–28, 2023	(Japan) 2023 World Championships	2	73.62	1	147.32	2	220.94
Apr 13–16, 2023	(Japan) 2023 World Team Trophy	1	76.90	1	148.57	2 (1)	225.47

Results in the 2023–24 season
Date	Event	SP		FS		Total	
Date	Event	P	Score	P	Score	P	Score
Sep 28–30, 2023	(Slovakia) 2023 CS Nepela Memorial	3	66.08	2	125.02	2	191.10
Oct 3–5, 2023	(China) 2023 Shanghai Trophy	1	69.57	3	126.83	2	196.40
Nov 3–5, 2023	2023 Grand Prix de France	3	66.30	5	124.66	4	190.96
Nov 24–26, 2023	(Japan) 2023 NHK Trophy	3	62.93	6	126.02	4	188.95
Jan 5–7, 2024	(South Korea) 2024 South Korean Championships	3	68.43	3	137.41	2	205.84
Jan 24 – Feb 4, 2024	(China) 2024 Four Continents Championships	11	56.07	9	113.31	11	169.38
Mar 18–24, 2024	(Canada) 2024 World Championships	3	73.55	12	121.93	6	195.48

Results in the 2024–25 season
Date	Event	SP		FS		Total	
Date	Event	P	Score	P	Score	P	Score
Jan 2–5, 2025	(South Korea) 2025 South Korean Championships	4	63.98	6	121.35	6	185.33
Feb 19–23, 2025	(South Korea) 2025 Four Continents Championships	10	60.77	8	122.33	8	183.10
Mar 25–30, 2025	(United States) 2025 World Championships	7	67.79	10	126.57	9	194.36

Results in the 2025–26 season
Date	Event	SP		FS		Total	
Date	Event	P	Score	P	Score	P	Score
Sep 5–7, 2025	(Japan) 2025 CS Kinoshita Group Cup	7	59.39	7	124.09	7	183.48
Oct 1–4, 2025	(Kazakhstan) 2025 CS Denis Ten Memorial Challenge	1	64.78	1	132.06	1	196.84
Oct 8–11, 2025	(Georgia (country)) 2025 CS Trialeti Trophy	3	62.10	3	121.18	3	183.28
Oct 24–26, 2025	2025 Cup of China	7	65.46	10	111.86	9	177.32
Nov 14–16, 2025	(United States) 2025 Skate America	7	64.06	9	108.93	8	172.99
Jan 3–6, 2026	(South Korea) 2026 South Korean Championships	5	66.38	5	129.62	5	196.00
Jan 21–25, 2026	(China) 2026 Four Continents Championships	6	67.06	6	125.60	5	192.66
Feb 17–19, 2026	(Italy) 2026 Winter Olympics	9	70.07	8	140.49	8	210.56
Mar 24–29, 2026	(Czech Republic) 2026 World Championships	10	68.50	16	116.68	13	185.18

Results in the 2026–27 season
Date	Event	SP		FS		Total	
Date	Event	P	Score	P	Score	P	Score
Sep 24–27, 2026	(Slovakia) 2026 CS Nepela Memorial	2	63.12	2	127.43	2	190.55
Nov 6–8, 2026	2026 Cup of China	6	67.49	3	143.30	3	210.79
Nov 20–22, 2026	(Finland) 2026 Finlandia Trophy	5	67.76	5	124.87	5	192.63

=== Junior level ===
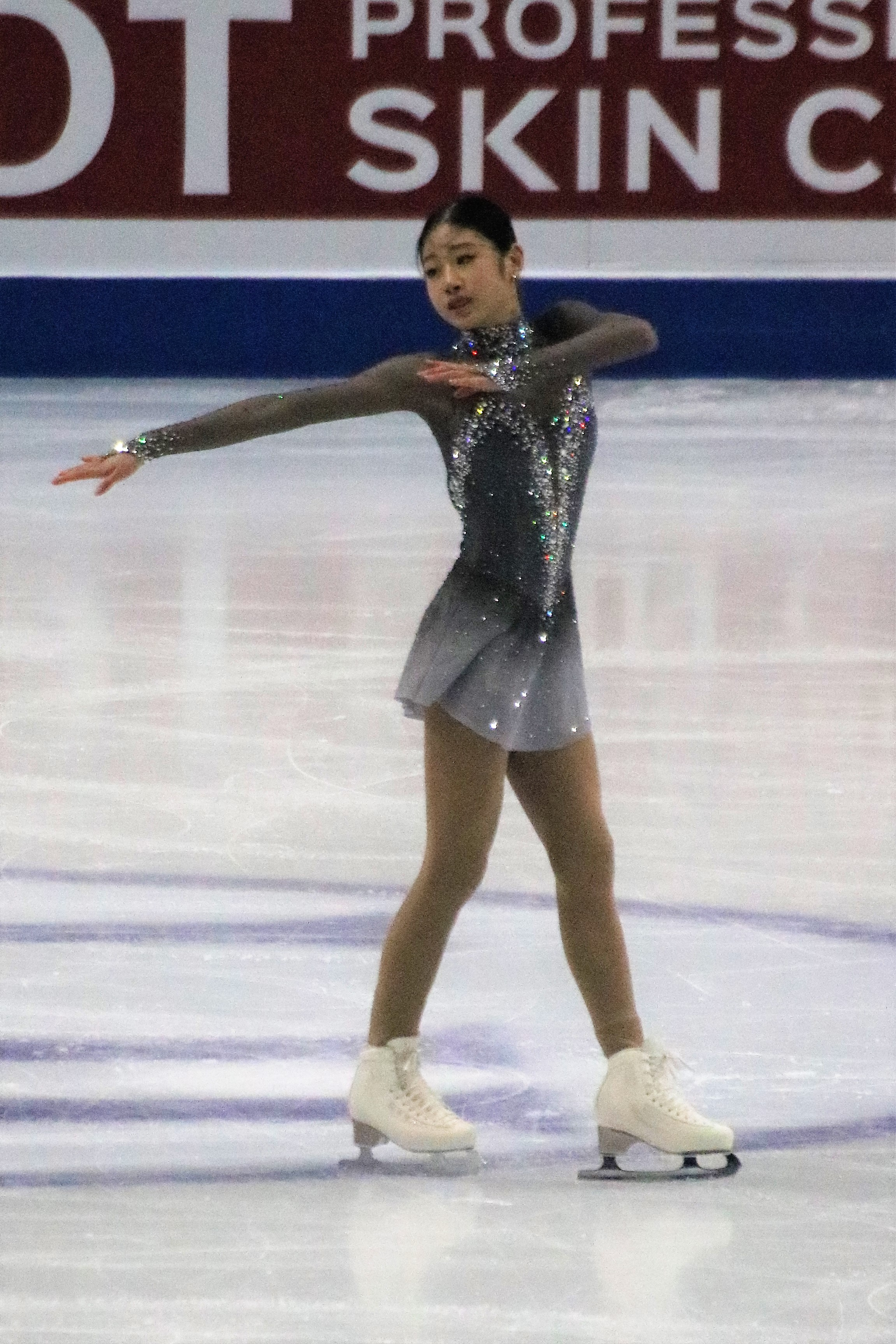
Lee at the 2019–20 Junior Grand Prix Final

Results in the 2018–19 season
Date	Event	SP		FS		Total	
Date	Event	P	Score	P	Score	P	Score
Aug 1–3, 2018	(Thailand) 2018 Asian Open Trophy	2	59.34	3	110.24	1	169.58
Aug 29 – Sep 1, 2018	2018 JGP Austria	7	53.17	4	112.25	4	165.42
Oct 3–6, 2018	2018 JGP Slovenia	4	63.01	3	117.47	3	180.48
Feb 13–15, 2019	(Russia) 2019 Winter Children of Asia International Games	3	65.16	6	109.57	5	174.73
Mar 4–10, 2019	(Croatia) 2019 World Junior Championships	14	53.02	7	118.95	8	171.97

Results in the 2019–20 season
Date	Event	SP		FS		Total	
Date	Event	P	Score	P	Score	P	Score
Sep 4–7, 2019	2019 JGP Latvia	3	66.93	1	130.70	1	197.63
Sep 25–28, 2019	2019 JGP Croatia	2	69.29	1	134.11	1	203.40
Dec 5–8, 2019	(Italy) 2019–20 Junior Grand Prix Final	6	65.39	4	128.99	5	194.38
Mar 2–8, 2020	(Estonia) 2020 World Junior Championships	2	70.08	6	123.03	5	194.01
