= 2022 South Korean Figure Skating Championships =

Figure skating competition

- Type: National championship
- Date: January 7 – 9
- Season: 2021–22
- Location: Uijeongbu, South Korea
- Host: Korean Skating Union
- Venue: Uijeongbu Indoor Ice Rink

Champions
- Men's singles: Cha Jun-hwan (S); Seo Min-kyu (J)
- Women's singles: You Young (S); Kwon Min-sol (J)
- Ice dance: Hannah Lim / Ye Quan (J)
- Previous: 2021 South Korean Championships
- Next: 2023 South Korean Championships

The 2022 South Korean Figure Skating Championships were held from January 7–9, 2022, at the Uijeongbu Indoor Ice Rink in Uijeongbu. It was the 76th edition of the event. Medals were awarded in the disciplines of men's singles, women's singles, and ice dance on the senior and junior levels. The results will be part of the Korean Skating Union's selection criteria for the 2022 Winter Olympics and the 2022 World Championships.

Due to the COVID-19 pandemic in South Korea, no spectators were allowed at the event.

== Schedule ==
Date	Start	Finish	Discipline	Event
Friday, January 7	10:05	14:06	Junior women	Short program
Friday, January 7	14:21	14:46	Junior men	Short program
Friday, January 7	14:46	15:08	Junior ice dance	Rhythm dance
Saturday, January 8	11:30	12:38	Senior men	Short program
Saturday, January 8	13:08	16:40	Senior women	Short program
Saturday, January 8	16:55	19:26	Junior women	Free skating
Saturday, January 8	19:41	20:05	Junior men	Free skating
Saturday, January 8	20:05	20:20	Junior ice dance	Free dance
Sunday, January 9	12:15	13:35	Senior men	Free skating
Sunday, January 9	13:50	16:45	Senior women	Free skating
All times are listed in Korea Standard Time (UTC+09:00).

== Medal summary ==
=== Senior ===
Discipline	Gold	Silver	Bronze
Men	Cha Jun-hwan	Lee Si-hyeong	Kyeong Jae-seok
Women	You Young	Kim Ye-lim	Lee Hae-in

=== Junior ===
Discipline	Gold	Silver	Bronze
Men	Seo Min-kyu	Park Hyun-seo	Kim Ye-sung
Women	Kwon Min-sol	Kim Yu-jae	Hwang Ji-young
Ice dance	Hannah Lim / Ye Quan	Kim Jin-ny / Lim Na-mu	No other competitors

== Entries ==
A list of preliminary entries was published on December 27, 2021.

=== Senior ===
Men	Women
Cha Jun-hwan	Han Hee-sue
Cha Young-hyun	Hong Seung-a
Jeong Deok-hoon	Hwang Chae-bin
Kim Han-gil	Jeong Ye-an
Kim Hyun-gyeom	Ji Seo-yeon
Kyeong Jae-seok	Kang Eun-soo
Lee Jae-keun	Kim Chae-yeon
Lee Si-hyeong	Kim Ha-nul
Lim Ju-heon	Kim Min-chae
Park Ji-woo	Kim Seo-yeong
	Kim Ye-lim
Lee Hae-in
Lee Hyun-soo
Lee Si-won
Lim Eun-soo
Lim Na-yun
Mo Ji-won
Moon Bo-in
Noh Chae-eun
Park Yeon-jeong
Shin Ji-a
Shin Sue-min
Song Si-woo
Wi Seo-yeong
You Young
Yun Ah-sun

=== Junior ===
Men	Women	Ice dance
Kim Ye-sung	Baek Kum-gyung	Hannah Lim / Ye Quan
Park Hyun-seo	Cho Yu-bin	Kim Jin-ny / Lee Nam-u
Seo Min-kyu	Faith Shim Dallao	
	Hwang Ji-young	
Hyun Ye-lin
Jeon Seo-yeong
Jeong Su-bin
Jun Yeon-sue
Kim Chan
Kim Min-jae
Kim So-hee
Kim Yu-jae
Kwon Min-sol
Lee Bo-seul
Lee Eun
Lee Ha-yul
Lee Hyo-rin
Lee Se-bin
Lee Soo-bin
Lim Seo-hee
Oh Ae-jin
Park Che-a
Park Hyun-a
Park In-kyong
Park Min-seo
Park Su-yeon
Roh Eun-jung
Shin Seung-yeon
Son Da-on
Yeon Chae-ju
Yeon Chae-yi
Yu In-seo
Yun Seo-jeong

== Senior results ==
=== Senior men ===
Rank	Name	Total points	SP		FS	
1	Cha Jun-hwan	283.31	1	98.31	1	185.00
2	Lee Si-hyeong	240.84	2	73.68	2	167.16
3	Kyeong Jae-seok	209.82	4	69.04	3	140.78
4	Cha Young-hyun	208.45	3	69.47	4	138.98
5	Kim Han-gil	199.87	7	66.02	6	133.85
6	Lee Jae-keun	199.66	5	67.54	8	132.12
7	Kim Hyun-gyeom	199.28	6	66.18	7	133.10
8	Lim Ju-heon	198.67	8	64.39	5	134.28
9	Jeong Deok-hoon	168.86	9	51.61	9	117.25
WD	Park Ji-woo	withdrew	10	47.35	withdrew from competition	

=== Senior women ===
Rank	Name	Total points	SP		FS	
1	You Young	221.49	1	76.55	1	144.94
2	Kim Ye-lim	207.64	4	67.52	2	140.12
3	Lee Hae-in	206.33	3	68.63	3	137.70
4	Shin Ji-a	204.08	2	68.97	4	135.11
5	Wi Seo-yeong	197.92	5	67.45	6	130.47
6	Yun Ah-sun	197.09	9	64.81	5	132.28
7	Kim Min-chae	191.51	7	65.12	8	126.39
8	Ji Seo-yeon	191.46	10	62.05	7	129.31
9	Lim Eun-soo	187.45	6	66.04	9	121.41
10	Kim Chae-yeon	184.93	8	64.90	10	120.03
11	Han Hee-sue	167.43	11	61.37	14	106.06
12	Moon Bo-in	167.15	12	58.00	11	109.15
13	Park Yeon-jeong	163.90	13	56.48	12	107.42
14	Lee Si-won	159.83	15	53.73	13	106.10
15	Song Si-woo	158.28	14	53.86	17	104.42
16	Kim Ha-nul	158.00	16	53.22	16	104.78
17	Kang Eun-soo	155.06	20	49.28	15	105.78
18	Jeong Ye-an	152.93	17	52.85	18	100.24
19	Kim Seo-yeong	150.54	18	52.69	20	97.69
20	Hong Seung-a	139.94	24	41.45	19	98.49
21	Mo Ji-won	139.30	19	50.91	22	88.39
22	Hwang Chae-bin	138.80	21	47.21	21	91.59
23	Lim Na-yun	123.29	22	43.61	23	79.68
24	Lee Hyun-soo	121.79	23	42.49	24	79.30
Did not advance to free skating
25	Shin Sue-min	40.21	25	40.21	—	
WD	Noh Chae-eun	withdrew	withdrew from competition			

=== Senior ice dance ===
Yura Min / Daniel Eaton, the only senior Korean ice dance team, did not travel to Korea from their Novi, Michigan, United States training base.

== Junior results ==
=== Junior men ===
Rank	Name	Total points	SP		FS	
1	Seo Min-kyu	187.33	1	61.21	1	126.12
2	Park Hyun-seo	131.73	3	40.54	2	91.19
3	Kim Ye-sung	119.06	2	41.13	3	77.93

=== Junior women ===
Rank	Name	Total points	SP		FS	
1	Kwon Min-sol	167.91	1	56.89	1	111.02
2	Kim Yu-jae	149.00	2	55.11	2	93.89
3	Hwang Ji-young	136.43	5	46.17	3	90.26
4	Youn Seo-jin	134.92	3	51.76	4	83.16
5	Cho Yu-bin	129.65	4	47.08	5	82.57
6	Lee Eun	122.80	7	42.63	6	80.17
7	Park Min-seo	117.67	11	40.60	7	77.07
8	Hyun Ye-lin	117.09	10	40.86	8	76.23
9	Park Che-a	116.69	6	42.74	9	73.95
10	Son Da-on	113.30	12	39.91	11	73.39
11	Park In-kyong	111.65	8	42.56	14	69.09
12	Lee Soo-bin	111.04	17	37.20	10	73.84
13	Jun Yeon-sue	110.30	9	41.19	13	69.11
14	Roh Eun-jung	107.52	16	37.31	12	70.21
15	Jeon Seo-yeong	106.22	14	38.66	15	67.56 *
16	Lee Bo-seul	105.26	13	38.69	17	66.57
17	Faith Shim Dallao	102.51	19	34.95	16	67.56 *
18	Park Hyun-a	97.64	15	38.65	20	58.99
19	Lee Ha-yul	96.56	20	34.38	18	62.18
20	Park Su-yeon	96.30	18	36.53	19	59.77
21	Kim So-hee	90.55	21	34.15	21	56.40
22	Yeon Chae-ju	86.94	23	33.32	22	53.62
23	Lim Seo-hee	86.85	22	33.71	23	53.14
24	Kim Chan	85.64	24	32.93	24	52.71
Did not advance to free skating
25	Jeong Su-bin	32.35	25	32.35	—	
26	Baek Kum-gyung	31.20	26	31.20	—	
27	Lee Se-bin	31.12	27	31.12	—	
28	Yeon Chae-yi	30.73	28	30.73	—	
29	Shin Seung-yeon	28.95	29	28.95	—	
30	Kim Min-jae	27.88	30	27.88	—	
WD	Lee Hyo-rin	withdrew	withdrew from competition			
WD	Oh Ae-jin	withdrew	withdrew from competition			
WD	Yu In-seo	withdrew	withdrew from competition			

* Jeon Seo-yeong finished at a higher place due to a better program component score.

=== Junior ice dance ===
Rank	Name	Total points	RD		FD	
1	Hannah Lim / Ye Quan	156.00	1	64.48	1	91.52
2	Kim Jin-ny / Lee Nam-u	104.99	2	44.50	2	60.49

== International team selections ==
=== Winter Universiade ===
The 2021 Winter Universiade, originally scheduled for January 21–31, 2021 in Lucerne, Switzerland, was postponed to December 11–21, 2021, before eventually being cancelled definitively on November 29, 2021. Athletes were selected at an internal competition prior to the South Korean Championships, before the event was cancelled.

	Men	Women	Ice dance
1	Jeong Deok-hoon	Choi Da-bin	
2	Kyeong Jae-seok	Kim Ha-nul	

=== Four Continents Championships ===
The 2022 Four Continents Championships will be held in Tallinn, Estonia from January 18–23, 2022. Athletes were selected at an internal competition prior to the South Korean Championships.

	Men	Women	Pairs	Ice dance
1	Cha Jun-hwan	Kim Ye-lim		
2	Kyeong Jae-seok	Lee Hae-in		
3	Lee Si-hyeong	You Young		
1st alt.	Cha Young-hyun	Wi Seo-yeong		
2nd alt.		Ji Seo-yeon		
3rd alt.		Park Yeon-jeong		
4th alt.		Lim Eun-soo		

=== Winter Olympics ===
The 2022 Winter Olympics will be held in Beijing, China from February 4–20, 2022.

	Men	Women
1	Cha Jun-hwan	Kim Ye-lim
2	Lee Si-hyeong	You Young
1st alt.		Lee Hae-in
2nd alt.		Wi Seo-yeong
3rd alt.		Ji Seo-yeon

=== World Junior Championships ===
Commonly referred to as "Junior Worlds", the 2022 World Junior Championships will be held in Sofia, Bulgaria from March 7–13, 2022.

	Men	Women	Pairs	Ice dance
1	Cha Young-hyun	Lee Hae-in		Hannah Lim / Ye Quan
2		Shin Ji-a		
3		Wi Seo-yeong		
1st alt.	Kim Han-gil	Yun Ah-sun		
2nd alt.	Lee Jae-keun	Kim Min-chae		
3rd alt.	Kim Hyun-gyeom	Ji Seo-yeon		

=== World Championships ===
The 2022 World Championships will be held in Montpellier, France from March 21–27, 2022.

	Men	Women	Pairs	Ice dance
1	Cha Jun-hwan	Kim Ye-lim		
2	Lee Si-hyeong	You Young		
1st alt.		Lee Hae-in		
2nd alt.		Wi Seo-yeong		
3rd alt.		Ji Seo-yeon		
