= 2021 South Korean Figure Skating Championships =

Figure skating competition

- Type: National championship
- Date: February 24 – 26, 2021
- Season: 2020–21
- Location: Uijeongbu, South Korea
- Host: Korean Skating Union
- Venue: Uijeongbu Indoor Ice Rink

Champions
- Men's singles: Cha Jun-hwan (S); Lee Jun-hyuk (J)
- Ladies' singles: Kim Ye-lim (S); Shin Ji-a (J)
- Previous: 2020 South Korean Championships
- Next: 2022 South Korean Championships

The 2021 South Korean Figure Skating Championships were held from February 24–26, 2021 at the Uijeongbu Indoor Ice Rink in Uijeongbu. It was the 75th edition of the event. Medals were awarded in the disciplines of men's and ladies' singles on the senior and junior levels. The results were part of the Korean selection criteria for the 2021 World Championships.

The event was originally scheduled to be held from January 8–10, 2021 in Seoul, before being postponed in December 2020 due to the COVID-19 pandemic in South Korea. It was later rescheduled and relocated. No audience was allowed to attend the event.

== Medal summary ==
=== Senior ===
Discipline	Gold	Silver	Bronze
Men	Cha Jun-hwan	Lee Si-hyeong	Cha Young-hyun
Ladies	Kim Ye-lim	Yun Ah-sun	Lee Hae-in

=== Junior ===
Discipline	Gold	Silver	Bronze
Men	Lee Jun-hyuk	Park Hyeon-seo	Kim Ye-sung
Ladies	Shin Ji-a	Han Hee-sue	Song Si-woo

== Senior results ==
=== Senior men ===
Rank	Name	Total points	SP		FS	
1	Cha Jun-hwan	257.12	1	90.36	1	166.76
2	Lee Si-hyeong	227.63	2	79.13	2	148.50
3	Cha Young-hyun	193.44	5	61.90	3	131.54
4	Jeong Deok-hoon	183.69	3	62.38	4	121.31
5	Kyeong Jae-seok	177.04	4	62.18	5	114.86
6	Lee Jae-keun	170.44	7	59.01	6	111.43
7	Kim Han-gil	163.92	6	60.89	7	103.03
8	Kim Hyun-gyeom	146.59	8	47.27	8	99.32
9	Park Geon-woo	136.22	9	42.76	9	93.46
WD	Lee Dong-hyeok	withdrew	withdrew from competition			

=== Senior ladies ===
Rank	Name	Total points	SP		FS	
1	Kim Ye-lim	199.31	3	68.87	2	130.44
2	Yun Ah-sun	197.99	5	66.29	1	131.70
3	Lee Hae-in	195.40	2	69.22	4	126.18
4	You Young	194.81	1	69.87	5	124.94
5	Wi Seo-yeong	192.84	6	65.86	3	126.98
6	Lim Eun-soo	179.06	4	67.25	9	111.81
7	Ji Seo-yeon	177.70	8	61.46	6	116.24
8	Park Yeon-jeong	174.19	7	62.08	7	112.11
9	Kim Chae-yeon	172.11	9	60.62	11	111.49
10	Kim Min-chae	169.28	10	57.54	10	111.74
11	Kim Ha-nul	165.98	11	53.98	8	112.00
12	Moon Bo-in	153.22	13	51.95	12	101.27
13	Kang Joo-ha	152.29	12	53.44	13	98.85
14	Kang Eun-soo	141.93	15	50.77	15	91.16
15	Lee Si-won	141.13	19	46.13	14	95.00
16	Hwang Chae-bin	135.39	16	47.71	16	87.68
17	Jung Ye-an	130.95	18	46.51	17	84.44
18	Lee Hyun-soo	126.93	17	47.67	19	79.26
19	To Ji-hun	125.51	14	51.62	22	73.89
20	Kim Seo-young	124.04	21	42.98	18	81.06
21	Yook Jeong-min	118.45	23	39.26	20	79.19
22	Mo Ji-won	118.25	20	43.06	21	75.19
23	Choi Hyun-soo	110.95	22	41.07	23	69.88
24	Seo Ye-eun	104.15	24	39.16	24	64.99
Did not advance to free skating
25	Jeon Su-been	38.94	25	38.94	—N/a	
26	Noh Chae-eun	31.11	26	31.11	—N/a	
27	Lee Eun-seo	withdrew	withdrew from competition			

=== Senior ice dance ===
Yura Min / Daniel Eaton, the only Korean ice dance team, did not travel to Korea from their Novi, Michigan, United States training base.

== Junior results ==
=== Junior men ===
Rank	Name	Total points	SP		FS	
1	Lee Jun-hyuk	135.15	1	48.66	1	86.49
2	Park Hyeon-seo	109.43	2	37.59	2	71.84
3	Kim Ye-sung	95.76	3	37.19	3	58.57

=== Junior ladies ===
Bae Min-ji withdrew prior to the event.

Rank	Name	Total points	SP		FS	
1	Shin Ji-a	147.49	1	55.90	3	91.59
2	Han Hee-sue	142.73	3	45.69	1	97.04
3	Song Si-woo	142.54	2	50.83	2	91.71
4	Cho Yu-bin	127.46	4	45.19	4	82.27
5	Jeon Seo-yeong	121.48	5	41.98	5	79.50
6	Lee Yea-lin	112.34	10	39.32	6	73.02
7	Kang Yeon-woo	106.81	6	41.02	11	65.79
8	Kim He-suh	105.79	8	39.97	10	65.82
9	Lim Ji-yun	105.67	11	38.83	8	66.84
10	Shim So-i	104.01	9	39.41	12	64.60
11	Hwang Ji-young	103.84	7	40.43	13	63.41
12	Cha Joung-in	102.58	14	36.10	9	66.48
13	Jun Yeon-sue	102.38	17	34.94	7	67.44
14	Oh Da-yeon	97.71	13	36.30	15	61.41
15	Kim Gyu-ri	96.85	12	36.33	16	60.52
16	Jeong Min-ji	96.26	15	35.94	17	60.32
17	Faith Shim Dal-lo	94.37	19	32.21	14	62.16
18	Lee Se-bin	92.78	16	35.55	20	57.23
19	Lim Chae-ryeong	92.37	18	32.62	18	59.75
20	Baek Kum-gyung	87.51	21	30.88	21	56.63
21	Shin Yun-jin	86.95	23	29.64	19	57.31
22	Lee Hae-na	80.40	22	29.69	23	50.71
23	Jung Su-bin	79.99	24	28.99	22	51.00
24	Choi Ji-an	77.78	20	31.44	24	46.34
Did not advance to free skating
25	Kim So-hee	28.25	25	28.25	—N/a	
26	Kwon Ye-eun	27.96	26	27.96	—N/a	
27	Lee Yeon-woo	26.25	27	26.25	—N/a	
28	Yeon Chae-ju	25.97	28	25.97	—N/a	
29	Cho Ha-yeon	25.22	29	25.22	—N/a	
30	Yeon Chea-yi	24.50	30	24.50	—N/a	
WD	Son Ga-in	withdrew	withdrew from competition			

== International team selections ==
=== World Championships ===
The World Championships are scheduled to be held from March 22–28 in Stockholm, Sweden. The team was reported on February 26, 2021.

	Men	Ladies	Pairs	Ice dance
1	Cha Jun-hwan	Kim Ye-lim		Yura Min / Daniel Eaton
2		Lee Hae-in		
Alt.	Lee Si-hyeong	You Young		

=== Four Continents Championships ===
The 2021 Four Continents Championships were scheduled from February 9–14 in Sydney, Australia, but were cancelled on October 16.

=== World Junior Championships ===
The 2021 World Junior Championships were scheduled from March 1–7 in Harbin, China, but were cancelled on November 24.
