= Lee Kyu-hyun =

South Korean figure skater (born 1980)

Personal information
- Born: October 15, 1980 (age 46) Seoul, South Korea
- Height: 1.80 m (5 ft 11 in)

Figure skating career
- Country: South Korea
- Skating club: KYU Sports Club, Gwachun City
- Began skating: 1987
- Retired: 2003

Lee Kyu-hyun (Korean: 이규현, born October 15, 1980) is a South Korean former competitive figure skater. He is an eight-time (1997–2003) South Korean national champion. He represented South Korea at the 1998 Winter Olympics and the 2002 Winter Olympics, placing 24th and 28th, respectively. His highest placement at an ISU Championship was 8th at the 1997 World Junior Championships. He is the brother of speed skater Lee Kyou-hyuk.

In January 2023, Lee was sentenced to four years in prison after being found guilty molesting and attempting to rape one of his 18-year old students he had been coaching as well as illegally filming the crime that had taken place the previous year. The court also banned Lee from working at child-related facilities for 10 years and to undergo 50 hours of a child abuse treatment program.

== Programs ==
Season	Short program	Free skating
2002–2003	Swing Kids produced by James Horner	Carmen Suite by Georges Bizet, Rodion Shchedrin performed by USSR Symphony Orchestra
2000–2002	Mission: Impossible by Jerry Goldsmith	Mission: Impossible III by Michael Giacchino

== Results ==
JGP: Junior Series / Junior Grand Prix

International
Event	93–94	94-95	95–96	96–97	97–98	98–99	99–00	00–01	01–02	02–03
Olympics					24th				28th	
Worlds			31st	30th	30th	26th	33rd	WD		
Four Continents							15th	14th		12th
Asian Games						4th				8th
Universiade										16th
Golden Spin									23rd	
Nebelhorn Trophy									18th	
Schäfer Memorial					15th					
International: Junior
Junior Worlds		34th	19th	8th	18th	13th				
JGP China						6th				
JGP Norway							10th			
JGP Sweden							14th			
JGP Ukraine					9th					
National
South Korean	2nd	2nd	1st	1st	1st	1st	1st	1st	1st	1st
WD: Withdrew
