= Tambuco =

Mexican contemporary classical percussion group

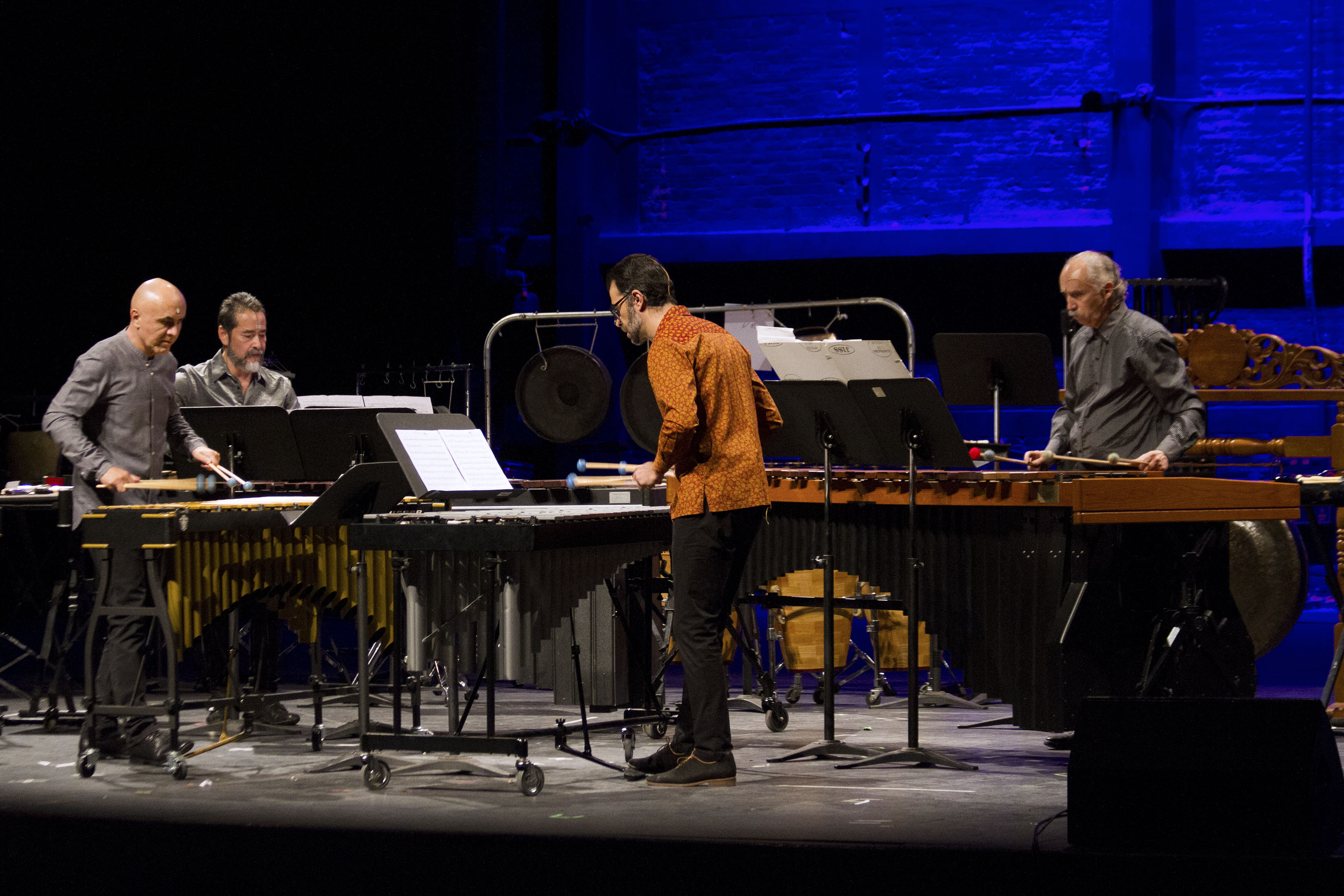
- Musical ensemble from Mexico

Background information
- Genres: Cuarteto Latinoamericano
- Years active: 1993–present
- Label: Quindecim Recordings
- Members: Ricardo Gallardo; Alfredo Bringas; Raúl Tudón; Miguel González
- Website: http://www.tambuco.org/

Tambuco is an ensemble that performs contemporary classical music from Mexico. Founded in 1993, they have received various awards and honors worldwide, including Grammy Award nominations and the Japan Foundation Award for Arts and Culture. Their name refers to the eponymous work by Mexican composer Carlos Chávez. Specialized media outlets such as Gramophone magazine and music critic Bernard Holland have highlighted their career, as they have managed to place concert music written by Mexican composers in various first-rate concert halls.

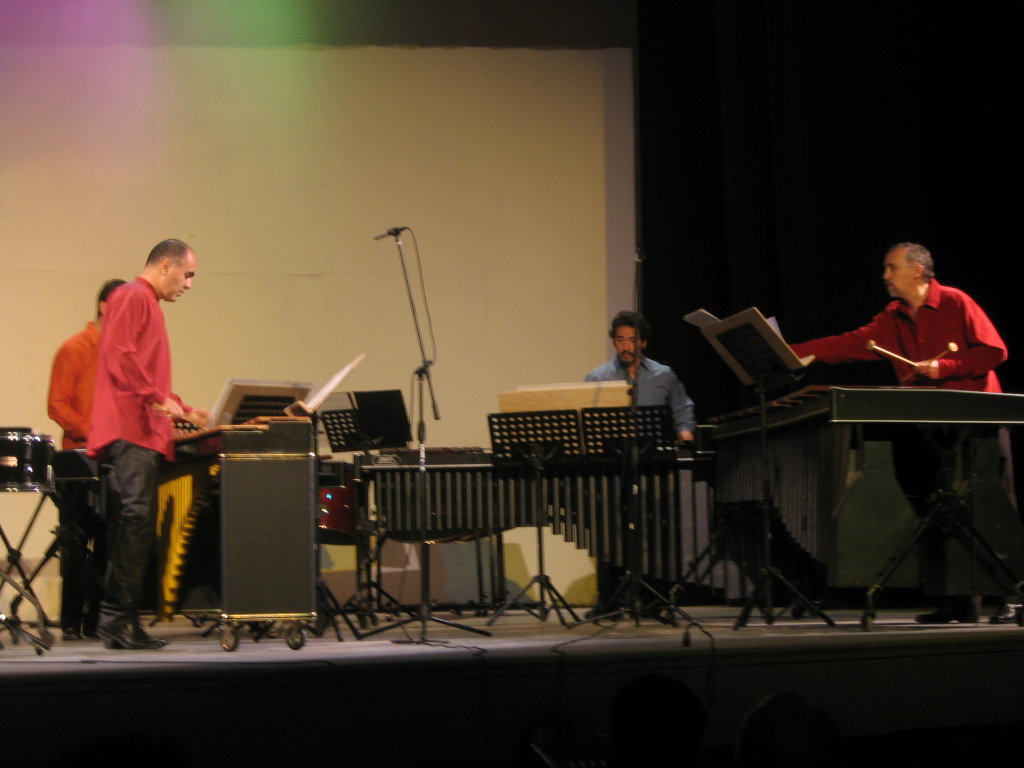
Tambuco on stage in 2003

== History ==
The ensemble was formed in 1993 with four Mexican percussionists. Among the ensemble's goals is the creation and performance of 20th- and 21st-century pieces related to percussion, and to that end their various albums have featured a wide variety of drums of different sizes and origins (bass drums, snare drums, timbales, güiros, teponaztlis, African drums), cymbals, bells, xylophones (marimbas, vibraphones), as well as experimentation with textures, materials, or objects from which sound can be derived. They also aim for contemporary Mexican concert music to be performed in various parts of the world.

They have performed in venues on five continents and in practically every major concert hall in Mexico. In addition to their work as an ensemble, Tambuco has collaborated as a guest ensemble with artists such as Eduardo Mata, Keiko Abe, Kronos Quartet, The Michael Nyman Band, the Mexico City Philharmonic Orchestra, among many others.

The soundtrack for the 2015 James Bond film Spectre also features a performance by Tambuco in the opening track, Los Muertos Vivos Estan.

== Members ==
- Ricardo Gallardo (artistic director)
- Alfredo Bringas
- Raúl Tudón
- Miguel González

== Discography ==
- 1995: Tambuco
- 1996: Música japonesa para percusiones
- 1997: Rítmicas
- 2012: Kailash
- Carlos Chávez Chamber Works vol. I
- World Premiere Recordings
- 2004: Serie Iberoamericana Vol. I: Colombia
- 2005: Carlos Chávez Chamber Works vol. III
- 2007: Serie Iberoamericana Vol. I: España
- 2009: William Kraft Encounters
- 2016: Café Jegog (recorded in Japan)
- 2022: Ramona. Original Soundtrack of the Telenovela "Ramona" (2000)
