= Gleb Smolkin =

Russian-Georgian ice dancer (born 1999)

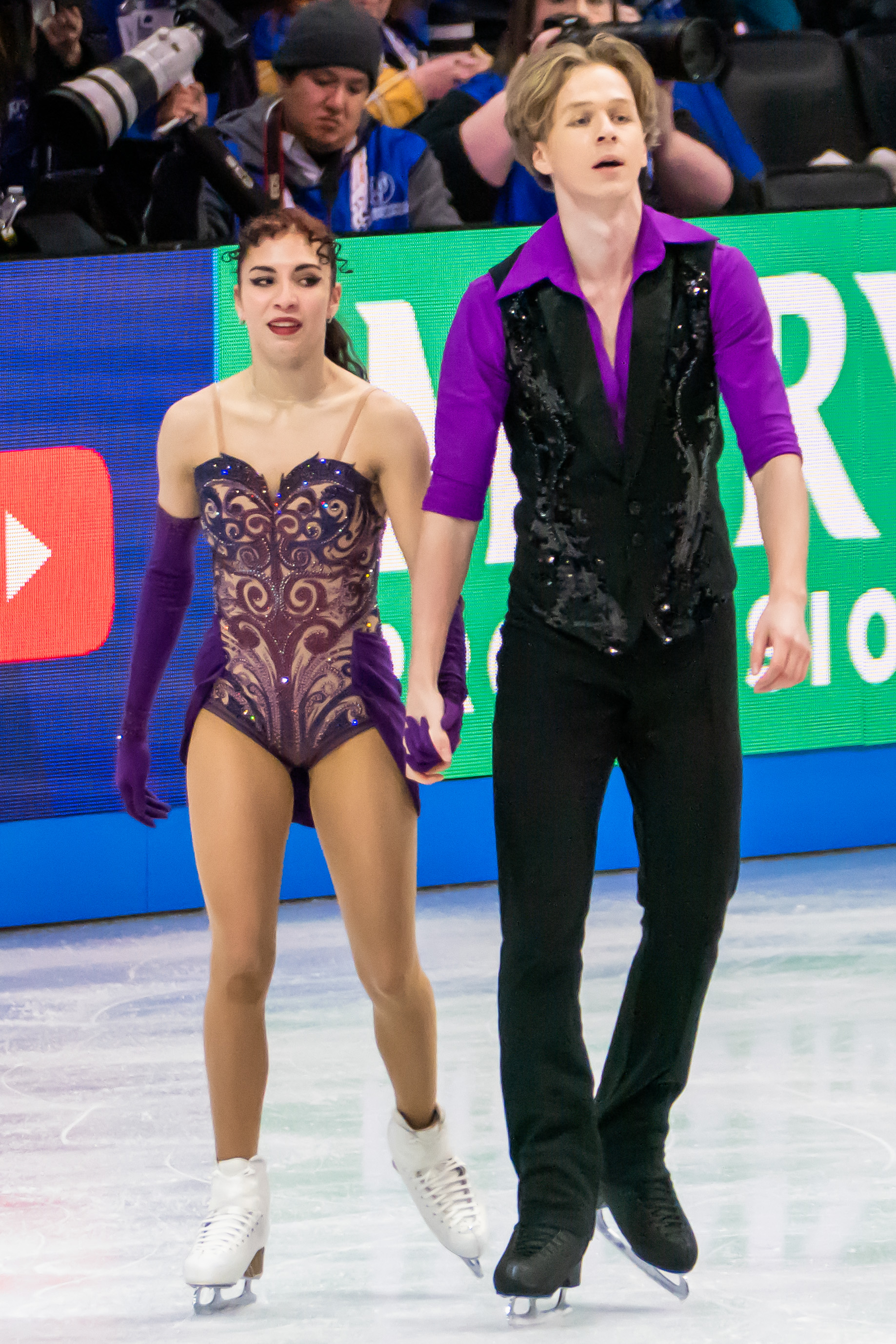
- Davis and Smolkin after their rhythm dance at the 2025 World Championships

Personal information
- Native name: Глеб Борисович Смолкин
- Full name: Gleb Borisovich Smolkin
- Born: August 27, 1999 (age 27) St. Petersburg, Russia
- Home town: Alexandria, Virginia, United States
- Height: 1.85 m (6 ft 1 in)

Figure skating career
- Country: Georgia (since 2023); Russia (2018–23)
- Discipline: Ice dance
- Partner: Diana Davis (since 2018)
- Coach: Marie-France Dubreuil; Romain Haguenauer; Patrice Lauzon; Pascal Denis; Josée Piché
- Began skating: 2003

Medal record
Representing Russia
Russian Championships
Silver medal – second place	2022 Saint Petersburg	Ice dance

Gleb Borisovich Smolkin (Russian: Глеб Борисович Смолкин; Georgian: გლებ ბორისოვიჩ სმოლკინი, born 27 August 1999) is an ice dancer who currently represents Georgia. With his skating partner and wife, Diana Davis, he is the 2026 Grand Prix de France silver medalist and 2026 Grand-Prix Cup of China silver medalist, a seven-time Challenger Series medalist (including four gold) and represented Georgia at the 2026 Winter Olympics.

Davis and Smolkin formerly represented Russia, where he is the 2021 CS Warsaw Cup champion, the 2022 Russian national silver medalist, and represented Russia at the 2022 Winter Olympics.

On the junior level, Davis/Smolkin are the 2020 Russian junior national bronze medalists, finished in the top five at the 2020 World Junior Figure Skating Championships, and competed at the 2019–20 Junior Grand Prix Final.

== Personal life ==
Smolkin was born on 27 August 1999 in Saint Petersburg, Russia. He is the son of Russian actor Boris Smolkin and his wife, Svetlana. He has one half-brother, Vladimir.

During a hiatus from figure skating in 2014, Smolkin briefly played professional beach soccer as a member of the BSC Lokomotiv Moscow team.

In March 2022, Smolkin married his skating partner, Diana Davis.

== Career ==
=== Early years ===
Smolkin began learning how to skate in 2004. He competed as a single skater until the 2014–15 season when he took a year-long hiatus from the sport. He returned to figure skating in November 2015 to compete as an ice dancer with his first partner, Ekaterina Mironova. The team competed together until spring of 2016 before parting ways. During the 2016–17 season Smolkin teamed up with Svetlana Lizunova, but the partnership was short-lived and lasted only a season before Smolkin began competing with his current partner, Diana Davis, coached by Svetlana Alexeeva and her team in Moscow.

=== 2018–19 season: Junior international debut ===
Davis/Smolkin made their junior international debut in September 2018 at the 2018 JGP Croatia. The team finished third overall at the event behind Russian teammates Khudaiberdieva/Nazarov in first and Georgian competitors Kazakova/Reviya in second, but despite their podium placement did not receive a second JGP assignment.

The team competed three more times internationally during the season, finishing third in the junior event at the 2018 Volvo Open Cup and second at both the 2018 Tallinn Trophy (junior) and the 2018 Russian-Chinese Youth Winter Games. At the 2019 Russian Junior Figure Skating Championships in February, they finished ninth.

=== 2019–20 season ===
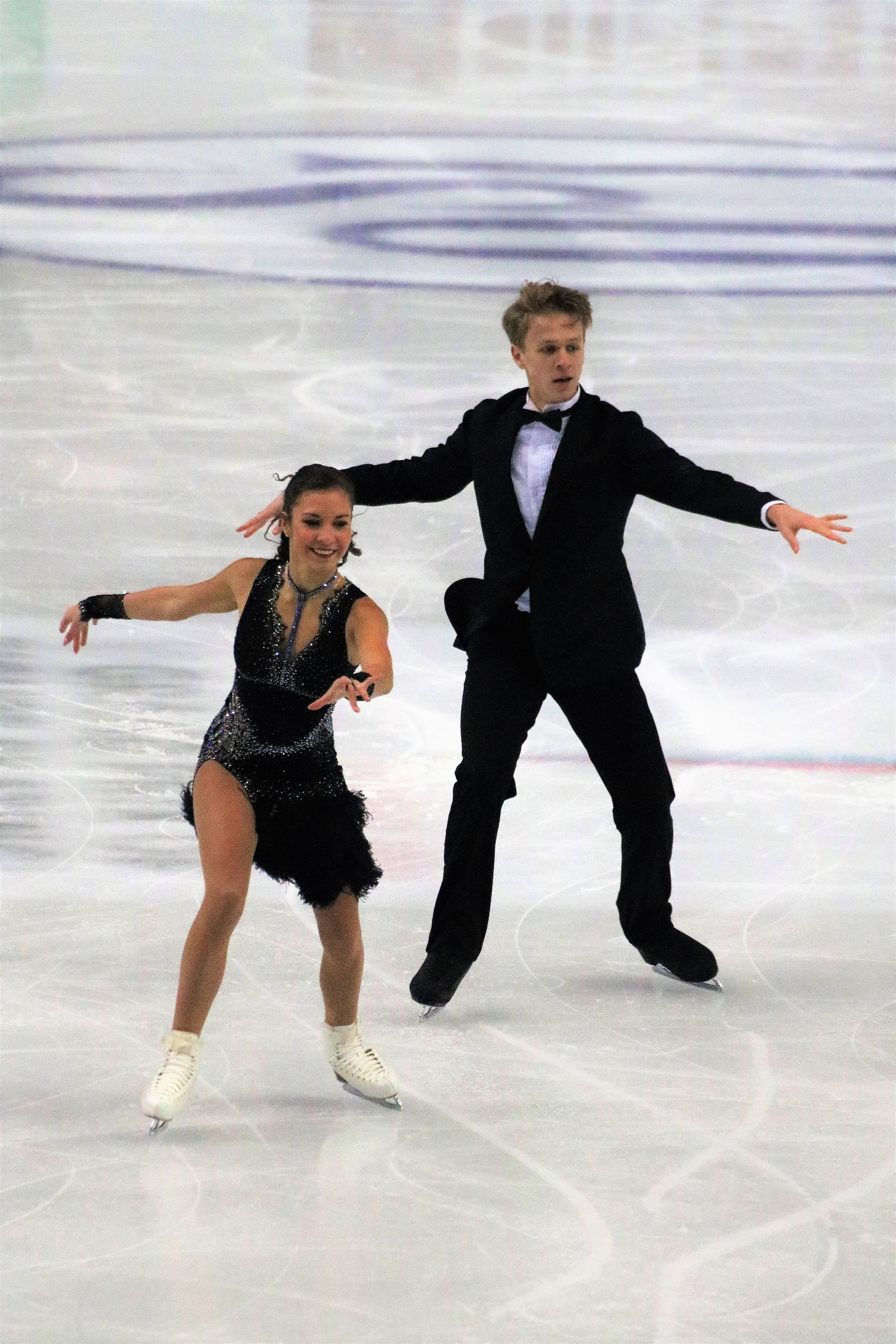
Davis and Smolkin during their rhythm dance at the 2019–20 Junior Grand Prix Final

In the summer before the start of the season, Davis and Smolkin relocated their training base from Moscow to Novi, Michigan to work with Igor Shpilband and Pasquale Camerlengo. The team opened their season in August at the 2019 JGP United States where they won the silver medal behind American training-mates Nguyen/Kolesnik. At their second assignment, 2019 JGP Russia, the team again finished second overall, this time behind fellow Russian competitors Shanaeva/Naryzhnyy, and with 26 qualifying points they advanced to the 2019–20 Junior Grand Prix Final. The team competed just once more before the Junior Grand Prix Final, taking the junior title at the 2019 Volvo Open Cup.

At the 2019–20 Junior Grand Prix Final, Davis/Smolkin entered the competition as the bottom seeded team and had a disappointing outing, finishing sixth in both segments of competition and sixth overall. However, they regrouped in the interim between the Final and the 2020 Russian Junior Championships and managed to earn the bronze medal at junior nationals, earning a spot on Russian team for the 2020 World Junior Championships. Competing at Junior Worlds, Davis/Smolkin scored personal bests in both segments of competition as well as overall, and finished in fifth.

=== 2020–21 season ===
After Davis sustained an ankle fracture in July 2020, her long-term recovery and a subsequent illness delayed Davis/Smolkin's return to full-time training. They did not compete at the 2021 Russian Junior Championships in January, but planned to return to Russia for the Russian Cup Final in March. At the Russian Cup Final, Davis/Smolkin placed first in both the rhythm dance and the free dance to take the junior title by a margin of about 5 points over silver medalists Kaganovskaia/Angelopol. They retained their Aristocats rhythm dance from the season prior, but debuted a new free dance to selections from the soundtrack of Moulin Rouge!.

=== 2021–22 season: Senior international debut and Beijing Olympics ===
Davis/Smolkin received their first senior-level Grand Prix assignment to the 2021 Skate Canada International, which was not without controversy in Russia as both they and the Morozov/Bagin, another team with political pull with the Russian Figure Skating Federation, received invitations, while other teams with higher rankings did not. In order to guarantee admission to Canada during the pandemic, both were vaccinated with the Pfizer–BioNTech vaccine in addition to having previously received Russia's own Sputnik V vaccine. The team debuted their programs for the Olympic season at the 2021 senior Russian test skates in September.

Davis/Smolkin made their senior international debut the week after test skates at the 2021 U.S. International Classic in Norwood, Massachusetts. At the event, the team won the silver medal behind American team Hubbell/Donohue. Going on to the Grand Prix, they placed fifth at Skate Canada International with new personal bests in both segments and overall.

Following their stint on the Grand Prix circuit, Davis/Smolkin competed at back-to-back ISU Challenger Series events in November. At the 2021 CS Cup of Austria, they finished just off the podium in fourth and set new personal bests in both segments of competition, as well as overall. Davis/Smolkin then competed at the 2021 CS Warsaw Cup, where they won their first international title. They upgraded their three new personal bests previously set at Cup of Austria the week before to take the gold medal ahead of Japanese team Muramoto/Takahashi in second, and American team Green/Parsons in third.

At their first senior Russian Championships in December, Davis/Smolkin controversially placed third in the rhythm dance ahead of longtime Russian number three team Zahorski/Guerreiro, outscoring them in the segment by over five points. In the free dance, Davis/Smolkin were able to capitalize on the withdrawal of top Russian team Sinitsina/Katsalapov due to injury and advance to second in the segment. They took the silver medal behind new national champions Stepanova/Bukin. Their placement was, again, not without controversy, with even bronze medalist Egor Bazin questioning the fairness of the scoring. As a result of their placement, Davis/Smolkin were assigned to the 2022 European Championships as one of three dance teams representing Russia.

Davis/Smolkin made their European Championships debut in January in Tallinn, Estonia. They placed eighth in the rhythm dance and seventh in the free dance to place seventh overall. When asked about the controversies surrounding their national placements, Smolkin remarked "after the Russian nationals, we stopped paying attention to all that. We let the redundant things go."

Davis/Smolkin were officially named to the Russian team for the 2022 Winter Olympics on 20 January. Competing in the 2022 Winter Olympics dance event, they placed fourteenth in the rhythm dance. Afterward the team rebuffed queries from reporters about a burgeoning doping scandal involving Kamila Valieva, a student of Davis' mother Eteri Tutberidze. Davis/Smolkin held their standing of fourteenth place in the free dance to finish fourteenth overall in their Olympic debut.

=== 2022–23: Hiatus, release from Russia, and transition to representing Georgia ===
Davis/Smolkin, along with their Russian compatriots, were barred from international competition indefinitely by the International Skating Union on 1 March 2022 due to the 2022 Russian invasion of Ukraine. The team chose to remain in the United States rather than return to Russia to compete domestically during the 2022–23 season, sparking rumors that they planned to transition to representing the U.S. as Davis is a dual citizen. Speculation was further fueled by the revelation that Davis and Smolkin wed on 18 March 2022, and were working towards attaining a green card for Smolkin. The team, along with Russian Figure Skating Federation spokesperson Olga Ermolina, denied that they would discontinue representing Russia. However, this changed on 5 June 2023 when it was announced that Davis/Smolkin had been released by the Russian Figure Skating Federation and would continue their ice dance career representing Georgia. Davis is of Georgian heritage through her maternal grandparents.

=== 2023–24 season: Debut for Georgia ===
Davis/Smolkin began their career under the Georgian flag with a victory at the Lake Placid Ice Dance International. On the Challenger circuit, they won the silver medal at the 2023 CS Nepela Memorial, before taking gold at both the 2023 CS Nepela Memorial and the 2023 CS Denis Ten Memorial Challenge.

Making their European Championship debut for Georgia at the 2024 edition in Kaunas, coming eighth. They went on to finish twelfth at the 2024 World Championships.

=== 2024–25 season ===
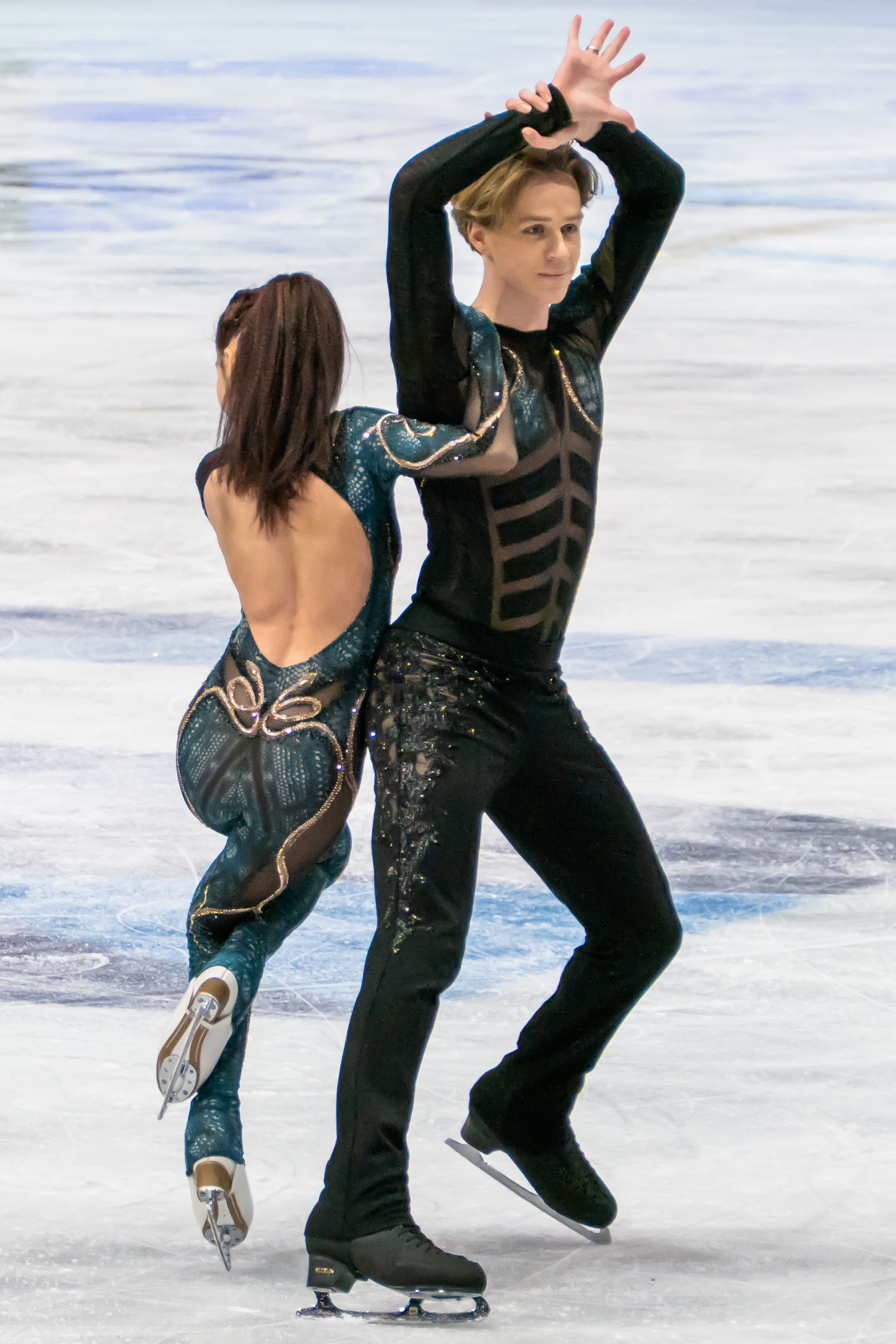
Davis/Smolkin during their free dance at the 2025 World Championships

Following the end of the 2023–24 season, Davis/Smolkin switched training locations to the Ice Academy of Montreal. They had intended to begin the season at the 2024 CS Denis Ten Memorial Challenge, but had to withdraw the day before it commenced when he suffered a muscle injury. As a result, they made their debut on the Grand Prix circuit at the 2024 Skate America. They ranked third in the rhythm dance with a score of 73.16. Fourth in the free dance, they dropped to fourth overall, finishing 4.56 points behind Spanish bronze medalists Smart/Dieck. Smolkin opined that it "was a good start into the season, and we felt good on the ice today. After yesterday, I know Diana wanted a medal, so that is of course a bit disappointing, but we are still a young team." One week later, they won silver at the 2024 CS Nepela Memorial. They placed eighth at their second Grand Prix, the 2024 Cup of China.

In December, Davis and Smolkin competed at a second Challenger, collecting their second silver medal of the season at the 2024 CS Golden Spin of Zagreb. The following month they placed eighth at the 2025 European Championships in Tallinn, Estonia.

At the 2025 World Championships in Boston, Massachusetts, United States, Davis/Smolkin were fourteenth in the rhythm dance. Tenth in the free dance, they moved up to tenth overall. In the process, they qualified a berth for Georgia at the 2026 Winter Olympics, which Smolkin said was "definitely something we're proud of."

Selected to compete for Team Georgia at the 2025 World Team Trophy, Davis/Smolkin placed fifth in the ice dance event and Team Georgia finished sixth overall.

=== 2025–26 season: Milano Cortina Olympics ===
Davis/Smolkin kicked off the season in October with two wins at back-to-back Challenger Series events at 2025 CS Denis Ten Memorial Challenge and 2025 CS Trialeti Trophy. They followed up with a fifth-place finish at 2025 Grand Prix de France. “It was physically and mentally challenging because I got a bit sick the last days and wasn’t physically feeling my best," said Smolkin after the free dance. "Also, we had three competitions in a row. We want to work on our levels. We do have a little time off now and then will prepare for Finland.” They subsequently placed sixth at 2025 Finlandia Trophy.

In January, Davis/Smolkin competed at the 2026 European Championships, finishing in sixth place overall. "I think we’ve achieved our goals for this competition," said Smolkin. “We can do better, but our coaches are very pleased with both programs. It’s by far the best of the season so far."

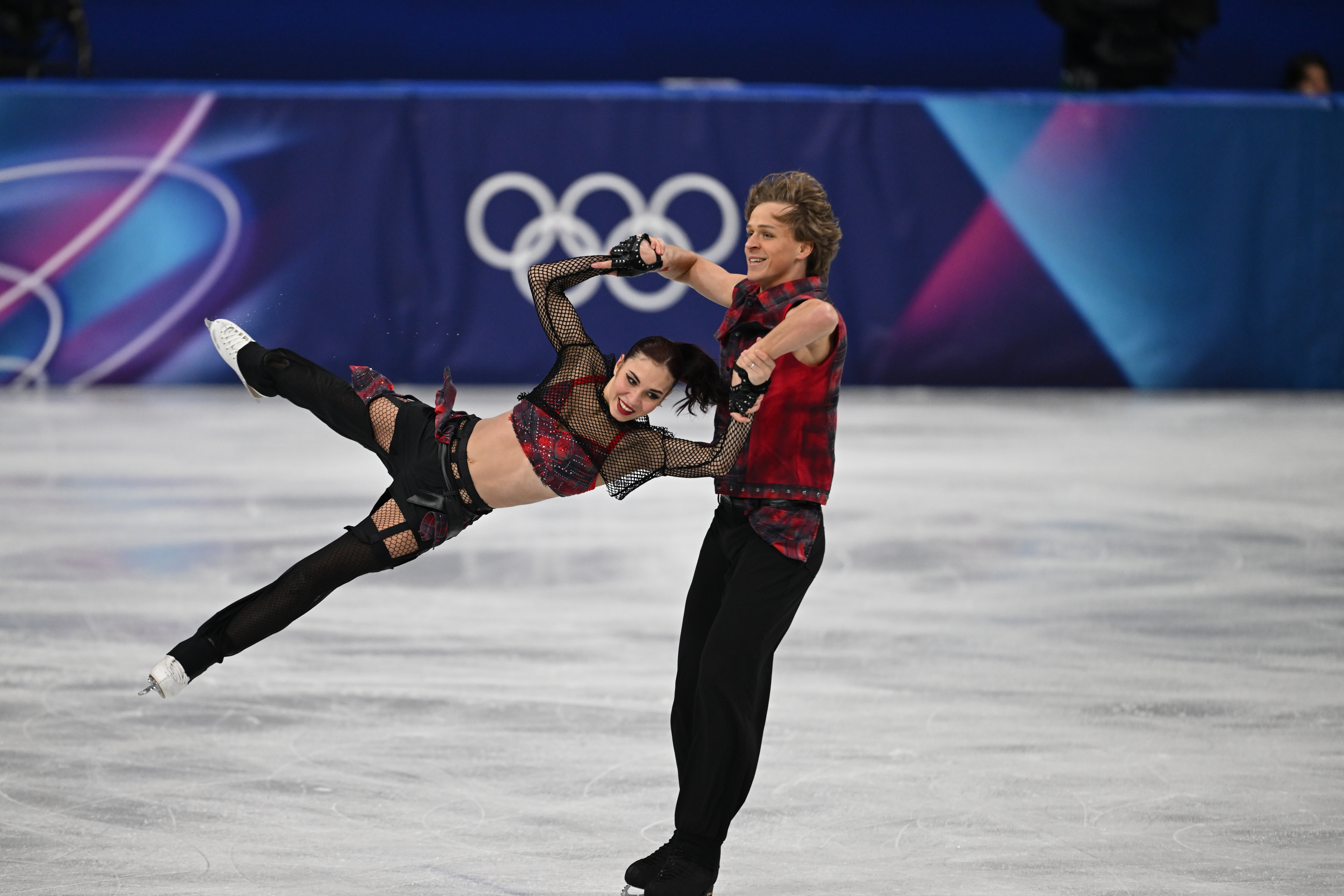
Diana and Gleb performing at the 2026 Winter Olympics

On 6 February, Davis/Smolkin competed in the rhythm dance for Team Georgia at the 2026 Winter Olympics Figure Skating Team Event, placing sixth. "It’s been great," said Smolkin following their performance. "I mean, in general, it’s been a bit exhausting, so we are trying to manage our excitement. I think the performance was quite good. We know we can do a bit better." The following day, the team finished fourth in the free dance, adding points to Team Georgia's standing. “We had a couple of moments that we will have to check on, but I think this is good before the individual event,” said Smolkin. “We were doing what we were training for, and now what happens now is out of our control. We know what we are capable of." They went on to compete in the free dance segment, placing fourth and Team Georgia ultimately finished in fourth place overall.

On 9 February, Davis/Smolkin compete in the rhythm dance in the individual ice dance event, finishing thirteenth in that segment. "We could have done better, but we still have the free dance so we can gain some points there," remarked Smolkin after their performance. "The free dance feels a bit more natural to us. I think this is the style that suits us well, and we feel very confident."

Two days later, Davis/Smolkin performed their free dance, placing eleventh in that segment and finishing in thirteenth place overall. "We have music that's called 'A Taste of Elegance', so we tried to be elegant, nice, and smooth, going through all the transitions and elements," said Smolkin following their performance. "In the beginning it was a bit more emotional. I think we succeeded, and we should be proud of ourselves."

=== 2026–27 season ===
Davis/Smolkin opened their season by competing at the 2026 Kinoshita Group Cup in Japan, taking home the gold medal. The team went on to earn a silver medal at 2026 Grand Prix de France. “If we continue getting better each week, the results will come,” Smolkin said. “Hopefully, this Grand Prix is just the beginning.”

Two weeks later, Davis/Smolkin competed at 2026 Cup of China where they placed second. “This time we tried to guarantee ourselves a position in the Final," said Smolkin. “We are proud of ourselves. It’s a great season. It’s been going quite well for us. We won both Challengers and two medals in the Grand Prix series. We are really happy. And we are very grateful for all the support from the crowd.”

== Programs ==
=== With Davis ===
Season	Rhythm dance	Free dance	Exhibition
2026–2027	Vivo Tango by Maxime Rodriguez choreo. by Romain Haguenauer	Prelude to a Soul by Sebastian Piano; Terra Rossa by Havasi; Ambivalence by Alex Korn choreo. by Romain Haguenauer	
2026–2027	Vivo Tango by Maxime Rodriguez choreo. by Romain Haguenauer	Within You (AI generated)	
2025–2026	Pretty Fly (For a White Guy); Come Out and Play by The Offspring choreo. by Romain Haguenauer, Samuel Chouinard	Sonata for Cello & Piano No.1 in D Major by Nikolai Myaskovsky; A Taste of Elegance by Anne-Sophie Versnaeyen & Gabriel SABAN choreo. by Romain Haguenauer, Samuel Chouinard	Alvin and the Chipmunks: Chipwrecked; Survivor by The Chipettes; Party Rock Anthem by The Chipmunks & The Chipettes
2025–2026	Pretty Fly (For a White Guy) by The Offspring; Bills, Bills, Bills by Destiny's Child choreo. by Romain Haguenauer, Samuel Chouinard	Sonata for Cello & Piano No.1 in D Major by Nikolai Myaskovsky; A Taste of Elegance by Anne-Sophie Versnaeyen & Gabriel SABAN choreo. by Romain Haguenauer, Samuel Chouinard	Alvin and the Chipmunks: Chipwrecked; Survivor by The Chipettes; Party Rock Anthem by The Chipmunks & The Chipettes
2024–2025	Lady Marmalade performed by Sheila E.; Music Is My Way of Life by Patti LaBelle; Lady Marmalade performed by Girls' Generation choreo. by Marie-France Dubreuil, Romain Haguenauer, Samuel Chouinard	Kashmir performed by Bond; Kashmir by Led Zeppelin; The Rain Song performed by Beth Hart; Black Dog by Led Zeppelin choreo. by Marie-France Dubreuil, Romain Haguenauer, Samuel Chouinard	Alvin and the Chipmunks: Chipwrecked; Survivor by The Chipettes; Party Rock Anthem by The Chipmunks & The Chipettes
2023–2024	Bad; Liberian Girl; Cheater by Michael Jackson	Suite (from Swan Lake) by Pyotr Ilyich Tchaikovsky performed by Riccardo Muti; Nina's Dream; Power, Seduction, Cries; Perfection (from Black Swan) by Clint Mansell choreo. by Elena Novak, Alexei Kiliakov	
2021–2022	Boom Boom Pow by Black Eyed Peas; Bom Bidi Bom (from Fifty Shades Darker) by Nick Jonas & Nicki Minaj choreo. by Pasquale Camerlengo and Adrienne Lenda	El Tango de Roxanne performed by Ewan McGregor, José Feliciano, and Jacek Koman; Your Song performed by Ewan McGregor and Alessandro Safina (from Moulin Rouge!) choreo. by Pasquale Camerlengo and Adrienne Lenda	Ev'rybody Wants to Be a Cat (from The Aristocats) by Phil Harris choreo. by Igor Shpilband and Pasquale Camerlengo
2020–2021	Ev'rybody Wants to Be a Cat (from The Aristocats) by Phil Harris choreo. by Igor Shpilband and Pasquale Camerlengo	El Tango de Roxanne performed by Ewan McGregor, José Feliciano, and Jacek Koman; Your Song performed by Ewan McGregor and Alessandro Safina (from Moulin Rouge!) choreo. by Pasquale Camerlengo and Adrienne Lenda	
2019–2020	Ev'rybody Wants to Be a Cat (from The Aristocats) by Phil Harris choreo. by Igor Shpilband and Pasquale Camerlengo	Always Watching You; Love Is Gone by Peter Cincotti choreo. by Igor Shpilband, Pasquale Camerlengo	
2018–2019	Tango: Oblivion by Astor Piazzolla; Tango: Por una cabeza performed by Il Divo choreo. by Mikhail Kolegov	Los Muertos Vivos Estan by Tambuco; Writing's on the Wall (from Spectre) by Sam Smith choreo. by Mikhail Kolegov	Diamonds by Rihanna

== Competitive highlights ==
- GP – Event of the ISU Grand Prix Series
- JGP – Event of the ISU Junior Grand Prix Series
- CS – Event of the ISU Challenger Series
- TBD – Assigned
- WD – Withdrew from competition
- Medals at team events are awarded for the team results only. Individual placements at team events are listed in parentheses.

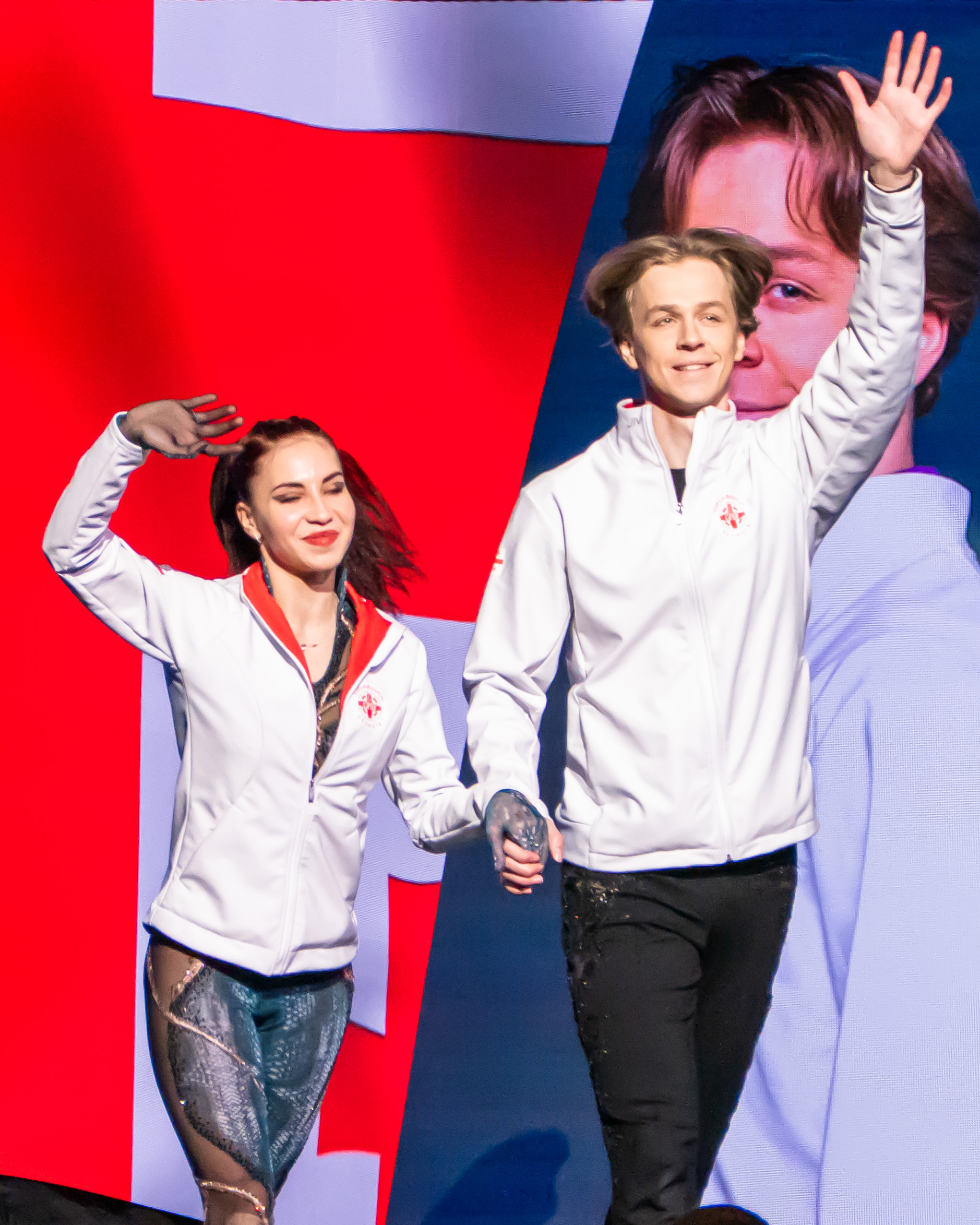
Gleb and Diana at the 2025 World Championships

=== Ice dance with Diana Davis (for Georgia) ===
Competition placements at senior level
Season	2023–24	2024–25	2025–26	2026-27
Winter Olympics			13th	
Winter Olympics (Team event)			4th	
World Championships	12th	10th	10th	
European Championships	8th	8th	6th	
World Team Trophy		6th (5th)		
GP Cup of China		8th		2nd
GP France			5th	2nd
GP Finland			6th	
GP Skate America		4th		
CS Budapest Trophy	1st			
CS Denis Ten Memorial	1st		1st	
CS Golden Spin of Zagreb		2nd		
CS Nepela Memorial	2nd	2nd		
CS Trialeti Trophy			1st	1st
CS Kinoshita Cup				1st
Lake Placid Ice Dance	1st			

=== Ice dance with Diana Davis (for Russia) ===
Competition placements at senior level
Season	2021–22
Winter Olympics	14th
European Championships	7th
Russian Championships	2nd
GP Skate Canada	5th
CS Cup of Austria	4th
CS Warsaw Cup	1st
U.S. Classic	2nd

Competition placements at junior level
Season	2018–19	2019–20	2020–21
World Junior Championships		5th	
Junior Grand Prix Final		6th	
Russian Championships	9th	3rd	
JGP Czech Republic	3rd		
JGP Russia		2nd	
JGP United States		2nd	
Russian–Chinese Winter Youth Games	2nd		
Russian Cup	2nd		1st
Tallinn Trophy	2nd		
Volvo Open Cup	3rd	1st	

== Detailed results ==
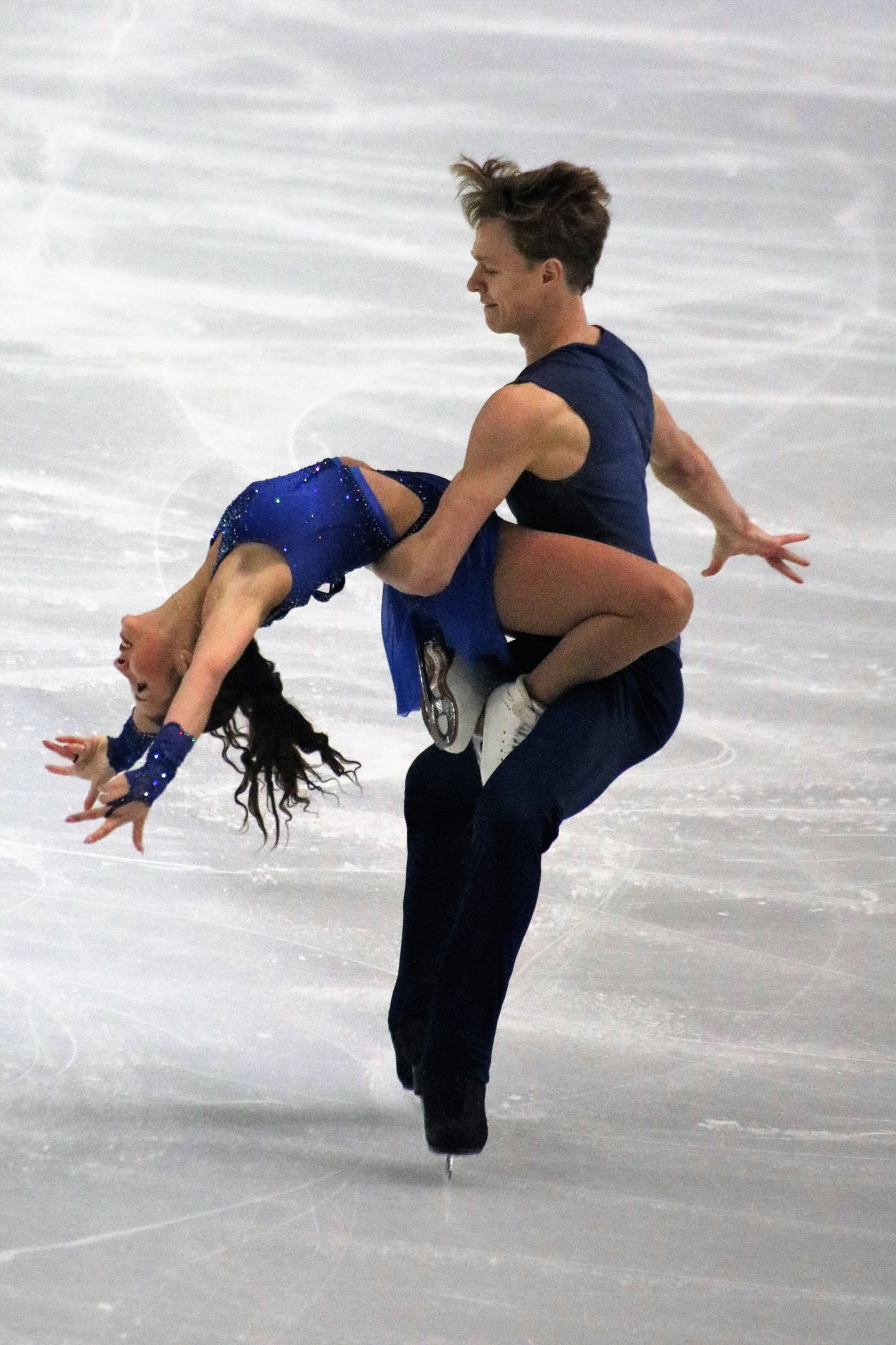
Davis/Smolkin performing a lift during their free dance at the 2019–20 Junior Grand Prix Final

=== Ice dance with Diana Davis ===
ISU personal best scores in the +5/-5 GOE System
Segment	Type	Score	Event
Total	TSS	208.67	2026 CS Trialeti Trophy
Rhythm dance	TSS	85.23	2026 CS Trialeti Trophy
Rhythm dance	TES	48.99	2026 CS Trialeti Trophy
Rhythm dance	PCS	36.24	2026 CS Trialeti Trophy
Free dance	TSS	123.44	2026 CS Trialeti Trophy
Free dance	TES	70.24	2025 CS Trialeti Trophy
Free dance	PCS	55.40	2026 CS Trialeti Trophy

==== For Georgia ====
Results in the 2023-24 season
Date	Event	RD		FD		Total	
Date	Event	P	Score	P	Score	P	Score
Aug 1–2, 2023	(United States) 2023 Lake Placid Ice Dance International	2	74.35	1	117.47	1	191.82
Sep 28–30, 2023	(Slovakia) 2023 CS Nepela Memorial	2	77.62	4	111.32	2	188.94
Oct 13–15, 2023	(Hungary) 2023 CS Budapest Trophy	1	75.21	1	116.63	1	191.84
Nov 1–4, 2023	(Kazakhstan) 2023 CS Denis Ten Memorial Challenge	1	76.56	1	116.11	1	192.67
Jan 10–14, 2024	(Lithuania) 2024 European Championships	7	76.33	8	113.13	8	189.46
Mar 18–24, 2024	(Canada) 2024 World Championships	12	74.46	14	113.88	12	188.34

Results in the 2024-25 season
Date	Event	RD		FD		Total	
Date	Event	P	Score	P	Score	P	Score
Oct 18–20, 2024	(United States) 2024 Skate America	3	73.16	4	113.89	4	113.89
Oct 24–26, 2024	(Czech Republic) 2024 CS Nepela Memorial	2	80.32	2	121.55	2	201.87
Nov 22–24, 2024	2024 Cup of China	8	70.53	7	111.79	8	182.32
Dec 4–7, 2024	(Croatia) 2024 CS Golden Spin of Zagreb	3	70.62	2	107.97	2	178.59
Jan 28 – Feb 2, 2025	(Estonia) 2025 European Championships	10	73.82	8	116.33	8	190.15
Mar 26–30, 2025	(United States) 2025 World Championships	14	73.22	10	117.28	10	190.50
Apr 17–20, 2025	(Japan) 2025 World Team Trophy	5	76.47	4	118.44	6 (5)	194.91

Results in the 2025–26 season
Date	Event	RD		FD		Total	
Date	Event	P	Score	P	Score	P	Score
Oct 1–4, 2025	(Kazakhstan) 2025 CS Denis Ten Memorial Challenge	1	77.94	1	115.20	1	193.14
Oct 8–11,2025	(Georgia (country)) 2025 CS Trialeti Trophy	1	80.35	1	123.04	1	203.39
Oct 17–19, 2025	2025 Grand Prix de France	4	77.80	5	116.47	5	194.27
Nov 21–23, 2025	(Finland) 2025 Finlandia Trophy	7	70.42	5	113.71	6	184.13
Jan 13–18, 2026	(United Kingdom) 2026 European Championships	6	78.67	6	120.64	6	199.31
Feb 6–8, 2026	(Italy) 2026 Winter Olympics – Team event	6	78.97	4	117.82	4	—N/a
Feb 9–11, 2026	(Italy) 2026 Winter Olympics	13	77.15	11	118.787	13	196.02
Mar 24–29, 2026	(Czech Republic) 2026 World Championships	10	79.34	9	119.31	10	198.65

Results in the 2026-27 season
Date	Event	RD		FD		Total	
Date	Event	P	Score	P	Score	P	Score
Sep 4–6, 2026	(Japan) 2026 CS Kinoshita Group Cup	1	79.74	2	110.25	1	189.99
Oct 1–4, 2026	(Georgia (country)) 2026 CS Trialeti Trophy	1	85.23	1	123.44	1	208.67
Oct 23-25, 2026	2026 Grand Prix de France	2	77.90	2	116.03	2	193.93
Nov 6–8, 2026	2026 Cup of China	2	79.31	2	114.23	2	193.54

==== For Russia ====
Senior level

2021–22 season
Date	Event	RD	FD	Total
February 12–14, 2022	2022 Winter Olympics	14; 71.66	14; 108.16	14; 179.82
January 10–16, 2022	2022 European Championships	8; 73.32	7; 113.29	7; 186.61
December 21–26, 2021	2022 Russian Championships	3; 83.99	2; 123.71	2; 207.70
November 17–20, 2021	2021 CS Warsaw Cup	1; 81.30	1; 118.60	1; 199.90
November 11–14, 2021	2021 CS Cup of Austria	4; 73.37	4; 111.25	4; 184.62
October 29–31, 2021	2021 Skate Canada International	7; 70.66	5; 109.91	5; 180.57
September 15–18, 2021	2021 U.S. International Classic	2; 75.21	2; 115.42	2; 190.63

Junior level

2020–21 season
Date	Event	RD	FD	Total
Feb. 26 – Mar. 2, 2021	2021 Russian Cup Final	1; 74.22	1; 112.16	1; 186.38
2019–2020 season
Date	Event	RD	FD	Total
March 2–8, 2020	2020 World Junior Championships	5; 66.53	5; 98.69	5; 165.22
February 4–8, 2020	2020 Russian Junior Championships	3; 70.91	3; 110.06	3; 180.97
December 5–8, 2019	2019 Junior Grand Prix Final	6; 59.89	6; 92.32	6; 152.21
November 5–10, 2019	2019 Volvo Open Cup	1; 68.00	1; 99.17	1; 167.17
September 11–14, 2019	2019 JGP Russia	2; 64.79	3; 93.45	2; 158.24
August 28–31, 2019	2019 JGP United States	2; 62.12	2; 98.05	2; 160.17
2018–2019 season
Date	Event	RD	FD	Total
Jan. 31 – Feb. 4, 2019	2019 Russian Junior Championships	9; 60.31	9; 93.78	9; 154.09
February 20–23, 2019	2018 Russian-Chinese Youth Winter Games	1; 61.15	2; 94.05	2; 155.20
Nov. 25 – Dec. 2, 2018	2019 Tallinn Trophy	2; 62.16	2; 89.00	2; 151.16
November 6–11, 2018	2018 Volvo Open Cup	3; 61.78	3; 92.65	3; 154.43
September 26–29, 2018	2018 JGP Czech Republic	3; 56.55	3; 92.07	3; 148.62
