= Kim Chae-yeon (figure skater) =

South Korean figure skater (born 2006)

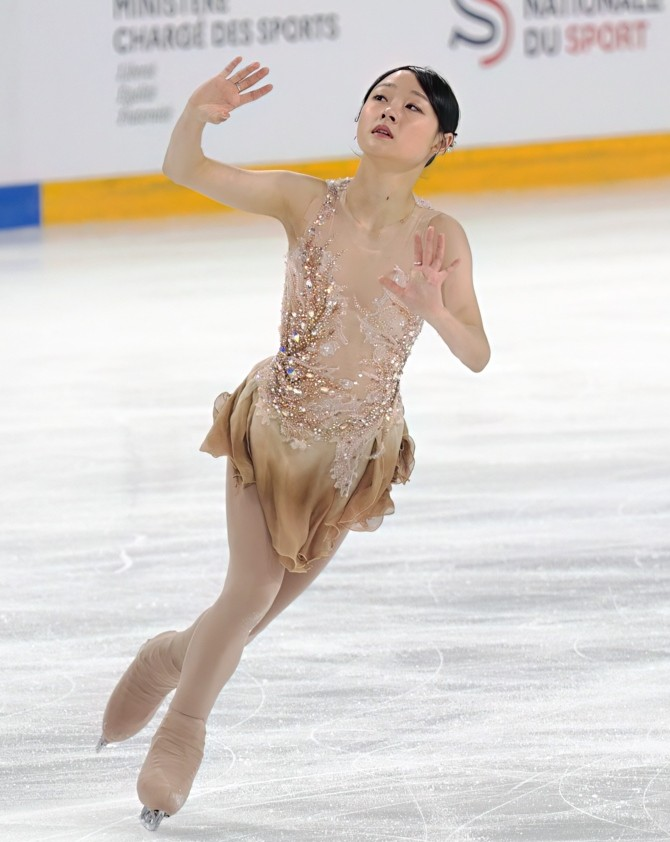
- Kim Chae-yeon at the 2024 Grand Prix de France

Personal information
- Native name: 김채연
- Other names: Chaeyeon Kim
- Born: December 8, 2006 (age 19) Seoul, South Korea
- Home town: Namyangju, South Korea
- Height: 1.54 m (5 ft 1/2 in)

Figure skating career
- Country: South Korea
- Discipline: Women's singles
- Coach: Choi Hyung-kyung; Kim Na-hyun; Lee Barkell; Jeffrey Buttle
- Began skating: 2017

Medal record
World Championships
| Bronze medal – third place | 2024 Montreal | Singles |
Four Continents Championships
| Gold medal – first place | 2025 Seoul | Singles |
| Silver medal – second place | 2024 Shanghai | Singles |
South Korean Championships
| Gold medal – first place | 2025 Uijeongbu | Singles |
| Bronze medal – third place | 2024 Uijeongbu | Singles |
Junior Grand Prix Final
| Bronze medal – third place | 2022–23 Turin | Singles |

Kim Chae-yeon (Korean: 김채연; born 8 December 2006) is a South Korean figure skater. She is the 2024 World bronze medalist, the 2025 Four Continents champion and 2024 Four Continents silver medalist, the 2023 Skate Canada International silver medalist, the 2024 Cup of China bronze medalist, a four-time ISU Challenger Series medalist (including two gold), the 2025 Asian Winter Games champion, the 2024 Shanghai Trophy champion, and the 2025 South Korean national champion.

At the junior level, she is the 2022–23 Junior Grand Prix Final bronze medalist and a three-time ISU Junior Grand Prix medalist.

Kim Chae-yeon medaled at the World Championships after practicing figure skating for only 7 years, a rare feat in the history of the sport.

== Personal life ==
Kim was born on December 8, 2006, in Seoul, South Korea. She is a devout Buddhist.

Kim's mother, Lee Jung-ah, is an interior designer and is responsible for designing all of her daughter's figure skating costumes.

== Career ==
=== Early years ===
Kim began skating in 2017 when she was in the fifth grade. She placed fourth in the junior category at the 2020 South Korean Championships.

In February 2021, Kim placed ninth, competing as a senior at the 2021 South Korean Championships. Due to this result, she became a member of the Korean national team.

=== 2021–2022 season: International junior debut ===
Kim made her international junior debut at the 2021 JGP France II, the second of two Junior Grand Prix events held in Courchevel in August. She placed second in both the short program and the free skate to finish second overall between American skater Isabeau Levito and Canadian Kaiya Ruiter. At her second JGP assignment of the season, the 2021 JGP Slovakia, Kim finished off the podium in fifth place.

In January 2022, Kim placed tenth in the senior women's category at the 2022 South Korean Figure Skating Championships.

Following the season, Kim made a coaching change from longtime coach, Han Sung-mi, to Chi Hyun-jung.

=== 2022–2023 season: JGP Final bronze, breakout senior season ===
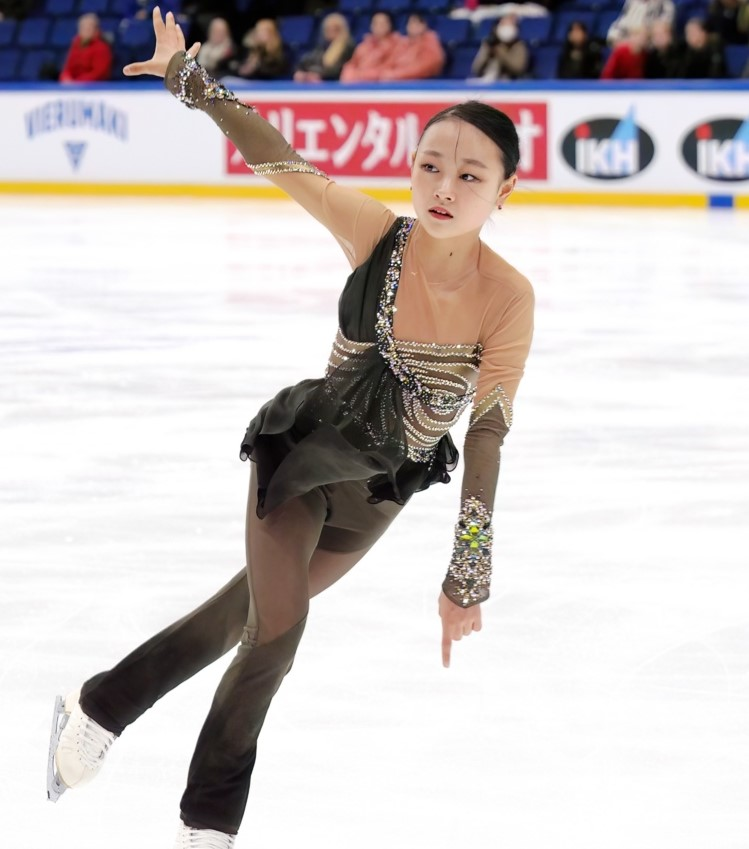
Kim performing her short program at the 2022 CS Finlandia Trophy

Kim opened her season back on the Junior Grand Prix circuit at the 2022 JGP Poland I, the first of two JGP events held in Gdańsk. She placed third in both segments of competition to win the bronze medal overall behind Japanese competitors Mao Shimada and Mone Chiba. The following week, Kim made her international senior debut at the 2022 CS Finlandia Trophy in Espoo. She placed third in the short program and second in the free skate, setting new personal bests in both segments of competition, as well as overall, to win the silver medal between compatriot Kim Ye-lim and Georgian skater Anastasiia Gubanova. The week after that, she competed at her second Junior Grand Prix assignment, the 2022 JGP Italy. After winning the short program in Egna, she took the silver medal behind Japan's Hana Yoshida, in the process qualifying for the 2022–23 Junior Grand Prix Final.

At the Junior Grand Prix Final in Turin, Kim placed third in the short program despite one of her triple jumps being deemed a quarter short of rotation. She was narrowly third as well in the free skate, winning the bronze medal. Kim and silver medalist Shin Ji-a were the first Korean women to medal at the event since Yuna Kim in 2005. She noted that Yuna Kim had inspired her to begin skating, saying "I tried to learn her choreography and her jumping technique, she is my role model."

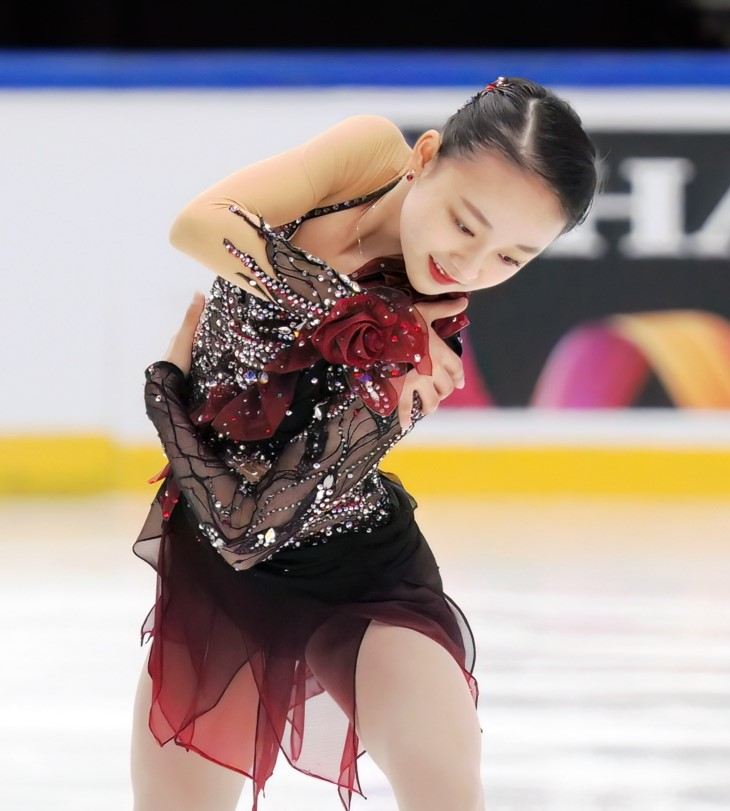
Kim during her free skate at the 2022 CS Finlandia Trophy

Kim finished fourth at the 2023 South Korean Championships. However, with national champion Shin ineligible for international senior competition, South Korea's third berths at senior ISU championships were assigned to Kim. Competing at the 2023 Four Continents Championships in Colorado Springs, Kim placed third in the short program with a new personal best score of 71.39, winning a bronze small medal. She had the highest technical score in the segment. Fifth in the free skate with errors on both her triple flip attempts, she dropped to fourth place overall, 2.59 points behind bronze medalist Chiba.

At the 2023 World Championships in Saitama, Kim finished twelfth in the short program after stepping out of her opening triple Lutz, missing the intended triple-triple combination. Although she was able to tack on a triple toe loop to the back end of her triple flip later in the program, the second jump was deemed underrotated by the technical panel. Following her performance, Kim stated that she was "very, very nervous" heading into the short program, although "happy about the great support from fans." In the free skate held two days later, Kim set a new personal best of 139.45 points after landing seven clean triple jumps including a triple Lutz-triple toe combination and earning Level 4s on all of her spins and footwork. For her performance, she received a small bronze medal for the free skate, vaulting herself up to sixth place overall.

=== 2023–2024 season: World bronze and Four Continents silver ===
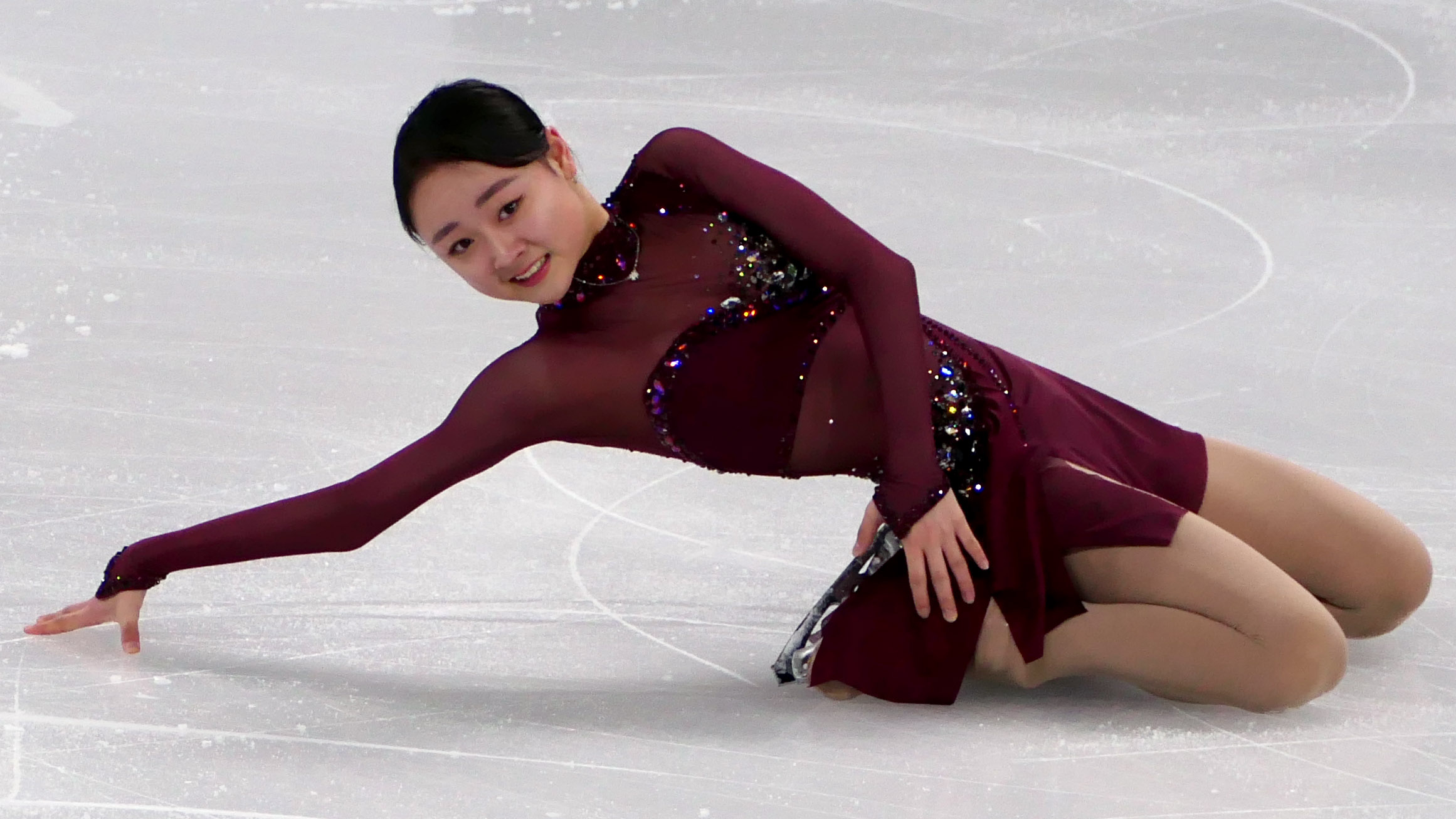
Kim finishing her short program at the 2024 World Championships

Beginning the season on the Challenger circuit, Kim won the bronze medal at the 2023 CS Lombardia Trophy before taking gold at the 2023 CS Nepela Memorial. She was invited to make her senior Grand Prix debut, appearing first at the 2023 Skate Canada International, where she was the youngest of the twelve women competing. She finished second in the short program and fourth in the free skate, coming second overall and taking the silver medal. After the free skate, she remarked "I didn't skate clean, but I am very happy with the result."

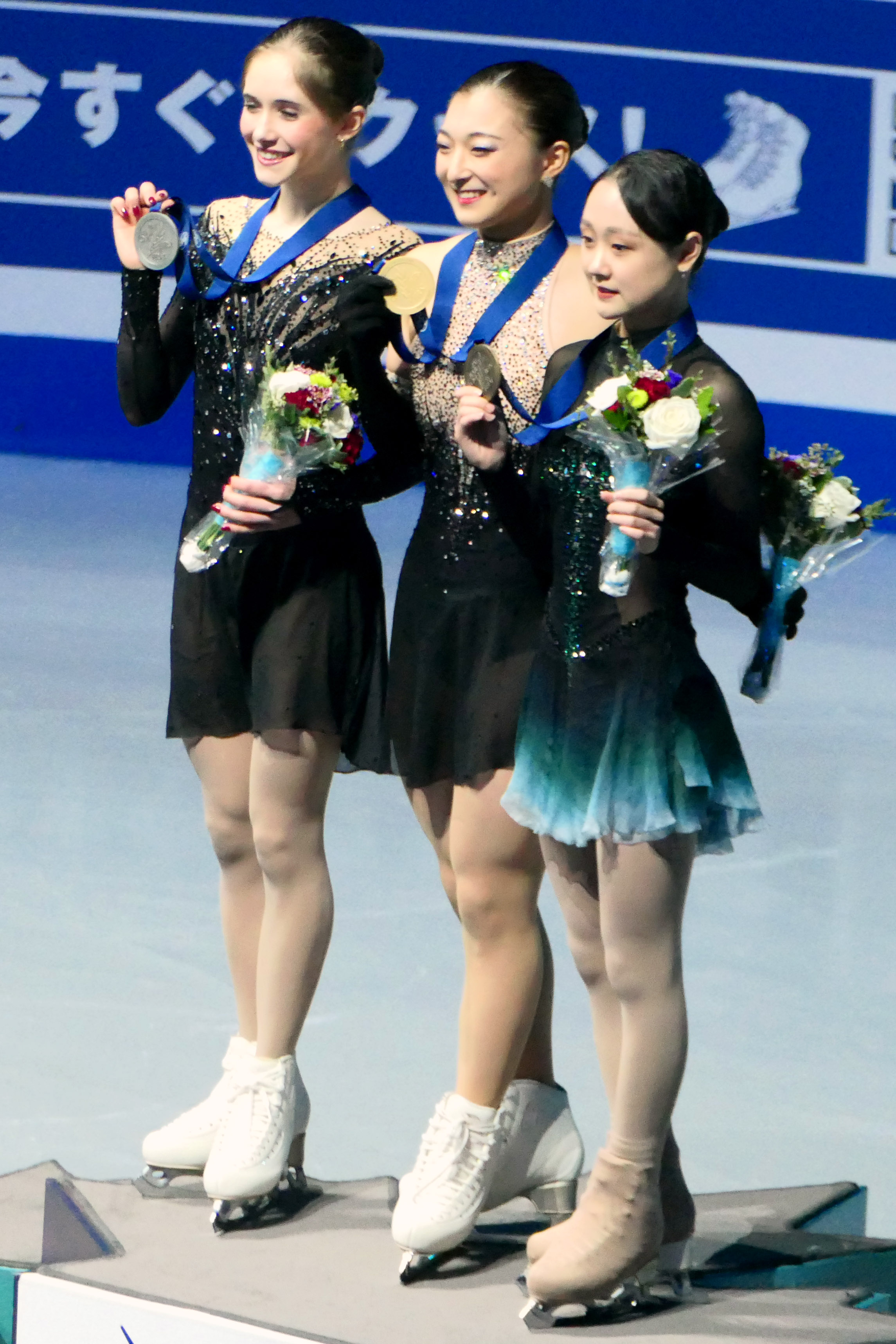
Kim (right) with Isabeau Levito (left) and Kaori Sakamoto (center) on the 2024 World Championships podium

Kim came third in the short program at the 2023 Grand Prix of Espoo but dropped to fourth place after a difficult free skate.

Kim reached the podium at the 2024 South Korean Championships, claiming the bronze medal. Assigned next to the 2024 Four Continents Championships in Shanghai, she finished second in the short program. Third in the free skate, she remained second overall, winning the silver medal, her first at an ISU championship. She reflected that after some disappointing results in the first half of the season, this result had "boosted my confidence."

Finishing the season at the 2024 World Championships, held in Montreal, Kim was sixth in the short program after receiving an incorrect edge call on a triple flip and an underrotation on the back end of her jump combination. Both of her triple flips in the free skate similarly were judged to have an incorrect edge, and her triple Salchow was called a quarter underrotated, but she placed third in the segment and moved up to third place overall, winning the bronze medal. This made her the third Korean woman to win a World medal, after Kim Yu-na and Lee Hae-in.

=== 2024–2025 season: Four Continents, National and Asian Winter Games champion ===
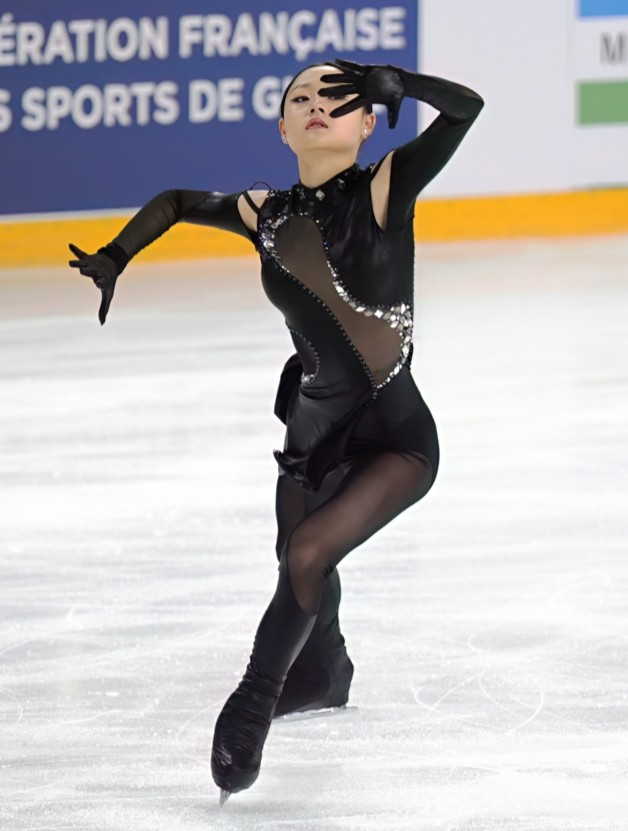
Kim performing her short program at the 2024 Grand Prix de France

Kim started the season in early October by taking gold at the 2024 Shanghai Trophy. One week later, she competed at the 2024 Korean Universiade and Asian Games Qualifiers, winning the event. With this result, Kim was selected to represent South Korea at the 2025 Asian Winter Games. Going on to compete on the 2024–25 ISU Challenger Series, Kim took the gold medal at the 2024 CS Trophée Métropole Nice Côte d'Azur.

At her first event on the 2024–25 Grand Prix circuit, the Grand Prix de France, Kim placed second in the short program but fifth in the free skate after having a hard fall on the second part of her triple lutz-triple toe combination and landing on her hip. She would drop to fourth place overall. She admitted to being "really nervous" in the free skate.

Three weeks later, at the 2024 Cup of China, Kim placed fourth in the short program but third in the free skate, where she skated cleanly and scored close to her personal best, moving up to the bronze medal position overall. Following the event, she said, "I want to show a more mature side of myself by using the experiences I have gained as a stepping stone." She was ultimately named as the second alternate for the 2024–25 Grand Prix Final.

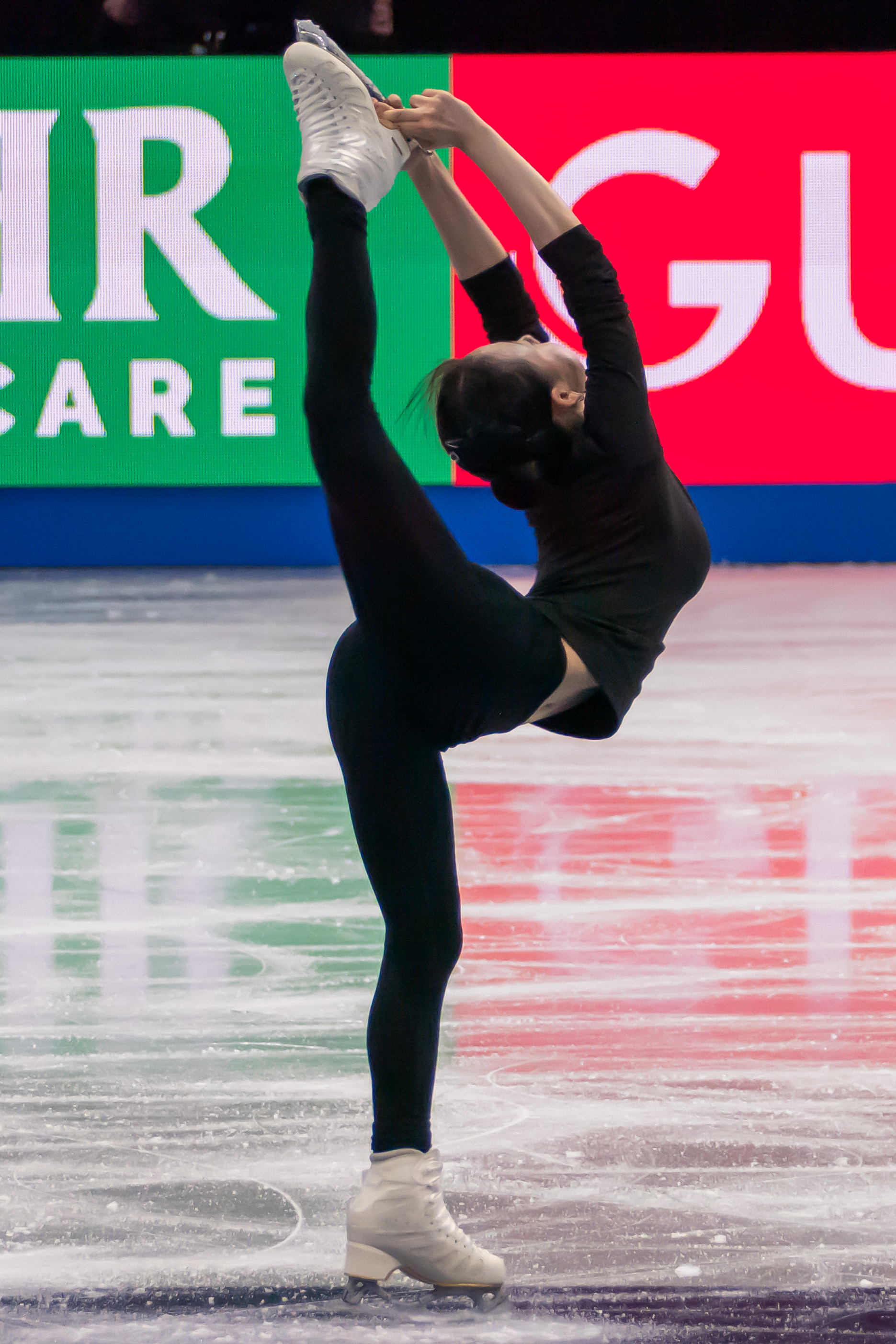
Kim performing a Biellmann spin during practice at the 2025 World Championships

In late November, Kim competed at the annual South Korean Ranking Competition, where she won the gold medal. Because of this result, she was selected to compete at the 2025 Four Continents Championships. One month later, Kim won the gold medal at the 2025 South Korean Championships, defeating two-time and defending national champion, Shin Ji-a. With this result, Kim was named to the 2025 World team.

At the 2025 Asian Winter Games in Harbin, China, Kim placed second in the short program but won the free skate, securing the gold medal by almost eight points ahead of three-time and reigning World Champion, Kaori Sakamoto. One week later, Kim competed at the 2025 Four Continents Championships in Seoul, where she won both the short program and free skate segments, scoring personal bests in the process and winning the gold medal by exactly eighteen points over silver medalist, Bradie Tennell. She became only the third South Korean women's singles skater to win Four Continents gold, after Kim Yuna and Lee Hae-in. Following the event, Kim said, "I was a little nervous because I wanted to show my best for the home crowd and I am glad I was able to do that. I wasn't feeling very well this morning, so I was worried about the performance. Fortunately, it turned out very well and I'm very satisfied with the result. I tried to get some confidence based on what I've accomplished at the Asian Winter Games."

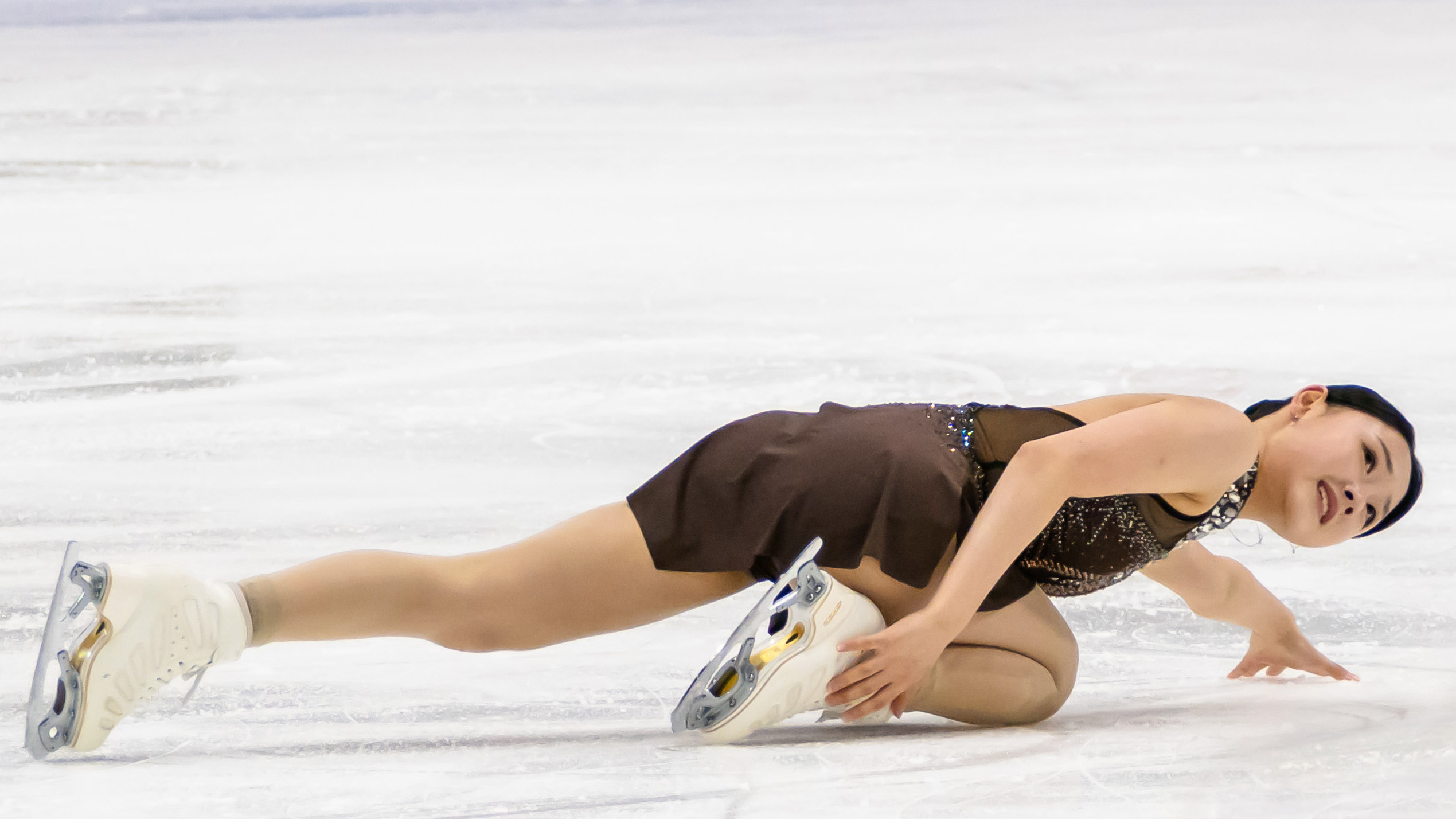
Kim during her short program at 2025 Skate America

The following month, three days before the 2025 World Championships, Kim was in a car accident, which further worsened a lower back injury she was dealing with at the time. Despite this, Kim did go on to compete at those Championships, where she finished in tenth place overall. "I want to work on my mindset and continue improving every element as I prepare for the Olympics," she said. "I think I’ll use new music next year and make some changes.”

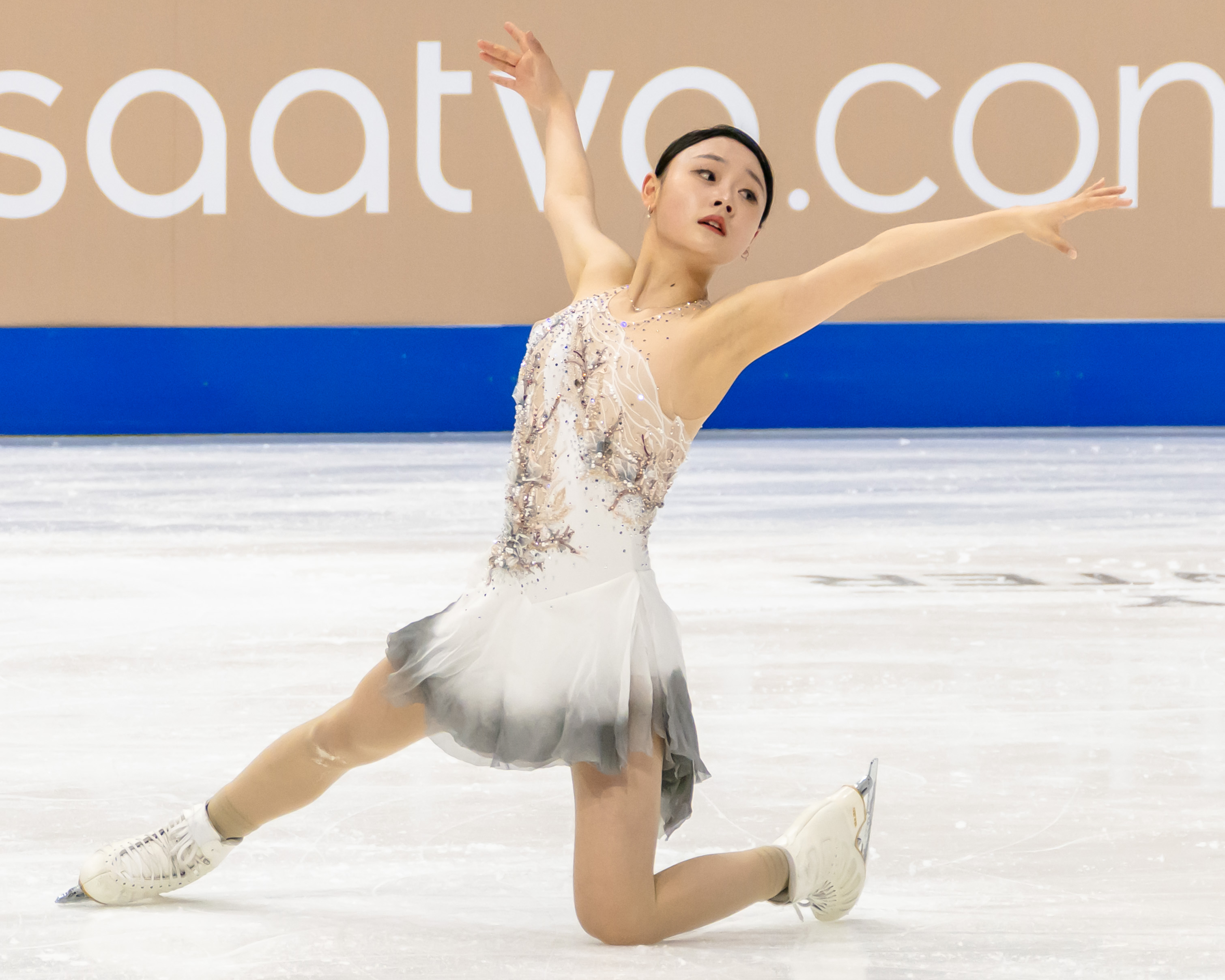
Kim performing her free skate at 2025 Skate America

=== 2025–26 season ===
In July, Kim ruptured a ligament in her right ankle and as a result withdrew from 2025 Skate Ontario Sectional Series that took place in August. It was subsequently announced that Kim had decided to move to Toronto, Ontario, Canada, to train under coaches Lee Barkell and Jeffrey Buttle, and that she would also make trips to Seoul to continue working with Choi Hyung-kyung and Kim Na-hyun.

She began the season at the 2025 CS Nepela Memorial, where she finished in twelfth place. The following month, she had a stronger showing at the 2025 Grand Prix de France and finished in sixth place. Kim cited lingering effects from an ankle injury. Despite nerves—especially performing a French program for a French crowd—she said she enjoyed the experience and felt progress in her recovery. She followed this up with another sixth-place finish at 2025 Skate America. The following week, Kim competed at the annual South Korean Ranking Competition, winning the bronze medal, and was subsequently named to the 2026 Four Continents team.

In January, Kim placed ninth overall at the 2026 South Korean Championships. Consequently, she was not named to the 2026 Winter Olympic team. She subsequently elected to withdraw from the Four Continents Championships.

== Programs ==
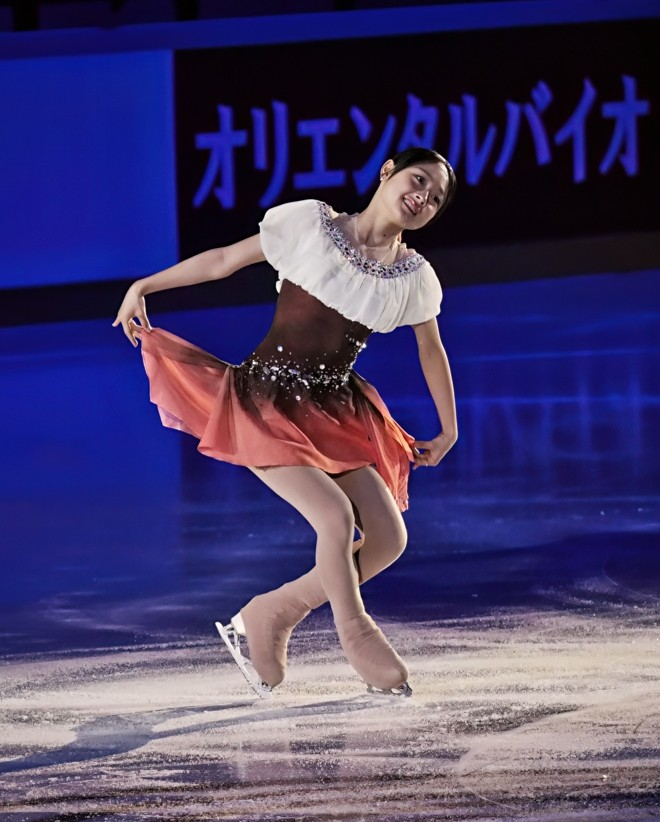
Kim during the 2024 Grand Prix de France gala

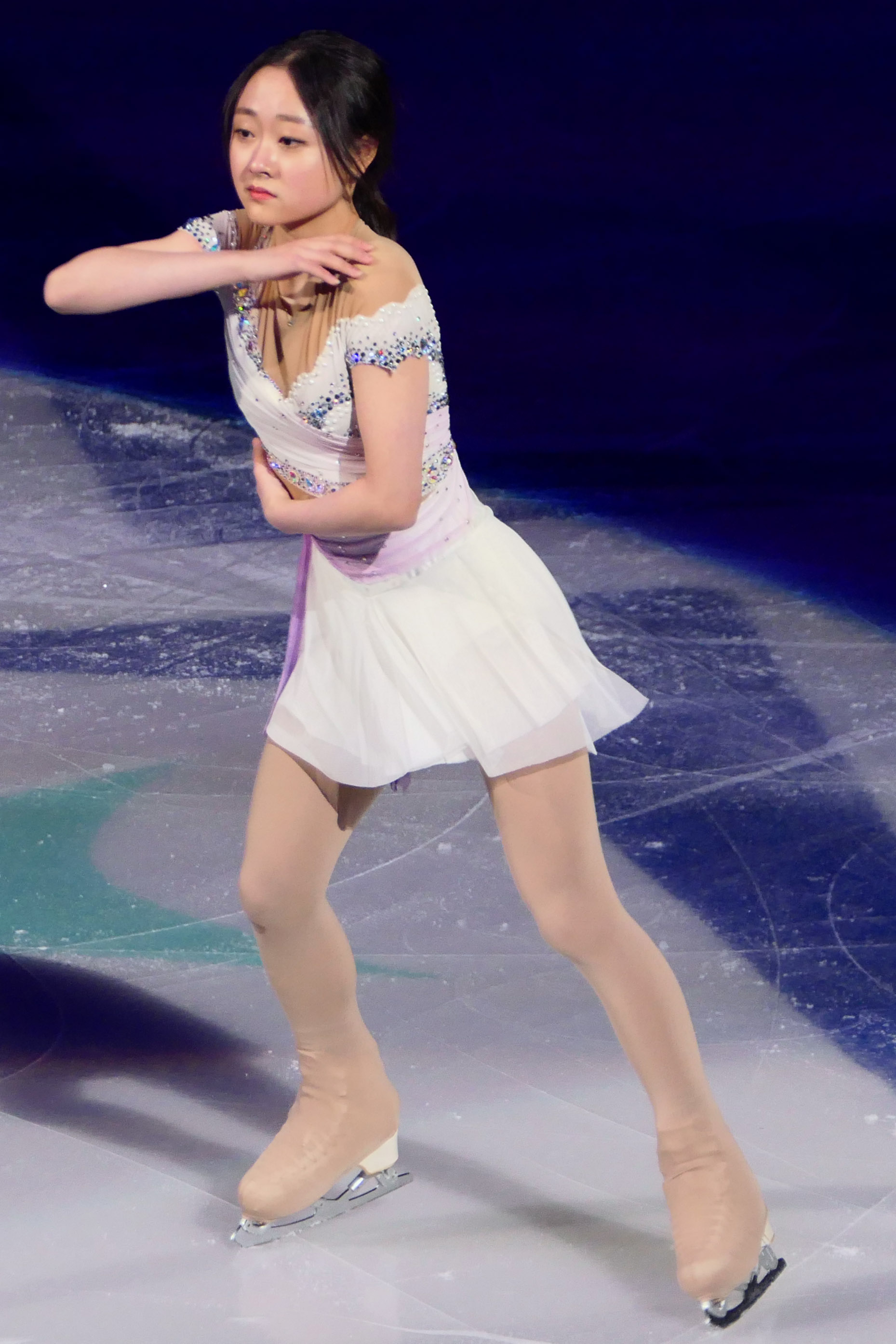
Kim during the 2024 World Championships gala

| Season | Short program | Free skating | Exhibition |
|---|---|---|---|
| 2025–2026 | Qui a le droit? by SANTA choreo. by Shae-Lynn Bourne | Whisperers from the Heart by Karl Hugo arranged by Hugo Chouinard; Love Dance (from Kà) by René Dupéré choreo. by Shin Yea-ji; Taegukgi; 전쟁! (The War); 영신 (Youngshin II); 에필로그 (Epilogue); 태극기 휘날리며 (Trailer Version) by Lee Dong-june choreo. by Jeffrey Buttle | Pantomeme by Karl Hugo; Lilies of the Valley (from Pina) by Jun Miyake choreo. by Shin Yea-ji |
| 2024–2025 | Tron: Legacy; Adagio for Tron; The Grid; Derezzed by Daft Punk choreo. by Benoît Richaud | Whisperers from the Heart by Karl Hugo arranged by Hugo Chouinard; Love Dance (from Kà) by René Dupéré choreo. by Shin Yea-ji | La La Land; Planetarium by Justin Hurwitz; Another Day of Sun by La La Land Cast; L’Amour, Les Baguettes, Paris by Stella Jang choreo. by Lim Eun-soo |
| 2023–2024 | Pantomeme by Karl Hugo; Lilies of the Valley (from Pina) by Jun Miyake choreo. by Shin Yea-ji | Le Bal des folles by Asaf Avidan arranged by Cédric Tour choreo. by Benoît Richaud | Last Train to London (I Won't Look Back) by Mimi Webb |
| 2022–2023 | Everybody Knows (from Justice League) by Leonard Cohen performed by Sigrid choreo. by Shin Yea-ji | Poeta En El Viento by Vicente Amigo choreo. by Shin Yea-ji | Exogenesis: Symphony Part 3: Redemption by Muse choreo. by Shin Yea-ji |
| 2020–2022 | Piano Concerto No. 2 by Sergei Rachmaninoff choreo. by Shin Yea-ji | Ambush from Ten Sides performed by The Silk Road Ensemble, Yo-Yo Ma choreo. by Shin Yea-ji | |
| 2019–2020 | Exogenesis: Symphony Part 3: Redemption by Muse choreo. by Shin Yea-ji | White Legend (based on Swan Lake) performed by Ikuko Kawai; Torn (Redux) (from High Strung) by Nathan Lanier choreo. by Shin Yea-ji | |
| 2018–2019 | The Godfather; Speak Softly, Love performed by David Davidson; Love Theme performed by Maksim choreo. by Shin Yea-ji | Popular (from Wicked) performed by Kristin Chenoweth choreo. by Shin Yea-ji | |

== Competitive highlights ==
- GP – Event of the ISU Grand Prix Series
- JGP – Event of the ISU Junior Grand Prix Series
- CS – Event of the ISU Challenger Series
- TBD – Assigned
- WD – Withdrew from competition

Competition placements at senior level
| Season | 2020–21 | 2021–22 | 2022–23 | 2023–24 | 2024–25 | 2025–26 | 2026-27 |
|---|---|---|---|---|---|---|---|
| World Championships | | | 6th | 3rd | 10th | | |
| Four Continents Championships | | | 4th | 2nd | 1st | | |
| South Korean Championships | 9th | 10th | 4th | 3rd | 1st | 9th | |
| GP Cup of China | | | | | 3rd | | |
| GP Finland | | | | 4th | | | |
| GP France | | | | | 4th | 6th | |
| GP Skate America | | | | | | 6th | |
| GP Skate Canada | | | | 2nd | | | |
| CS Finlandia Trophy | | | 3rd | | | | |
| CS Lombardia Trophy | | | | 3rd | | | |
| CS Nepela Memorial | | | | 1st | | 12th | |
| CS Trophée Métropole | | | | | 1st | | |
| Asian Winter Games | | | | | 1st | | |
| Shanghai Trophy | | | | | 1st | | |

Competition placements at junior level
| Season | 2019–20 | 2021–22 | 2022–23 |
|---|---|---|---|
| Junior Grand Prix Final | | | 3rd |
| South Korean Championships | 4th | | |
| JGP France | | 2nd | |
| JGP Italy | | | 2nd |
| JGP Poland | | | 3rd |
| JGP Slovakia | | 5th | |

== Detailed results ==
ISU personal best scores in the +5/-5 GOE System
| Segment | Type | Score | Event |
|---|---|---|---|
| Total | **TSS** | **222.38** | 2025 Four Continents Championships |
| Short program | **TSS** | **74.02** | 2025 Four Continents Championships |
| Short program | TES | 40.45 | 2022 JGP Italy |
| Short program | PCS | 33.87 | 2025 Four Continents Championships |
| Free skating | **TSS** | **148.36** | 2025 Four Continents Championships |
| Free skating | TES | 78.27 | 2025 Four Continents Championships |
| Free skating | PCS | 70.09 | 2025 Four Continents Championships |

=== Senior level ===
- Small medals for the short program and free skating are only awarded at ISU Championships.
- Medals at team events are awarded for the team results only. Individual placements at team events are listed in parentheses.
- ISU Personal Bests highlighted in **bold**.

Results in the 2022–23 season
| Date | Event | SP | | FS | | Total | |
| Date | Event | P | Score | P | Score | P | Score |
|---|---|---|---|---|---|---|---|
| Oct 4 – 9, 2022 | (Finland) 2022 CS Finlandia Trophy | 3 | 67.84 | 2 | 137.67 | 2 | 205.51 |
| Jan 5 – 9, 2023 | (South Korea) 2023 South Korean Championships | 4 | 70.69 | 6 | 129.91 | 4 | 200.60 |
| Feb 7 – 12, 2023 | (United States) 2023 Four Continents Championships | 3 | 71.39 | 5 | 131.00 | 4 | 202.39 |
| Mar 22 – 26, 2023 | (Japan) 2023 World Championships | 12 | 64.06 | 3 | 139.45 | 6 | 203.51 |

Results in the 2023–24 season
| Date | Event | SP | | FS | | Total | |
| Date | Event | P | Score | P | Score | P | Score |
|---|---|---|---|---|---|---|---|
| Sep 8 – 10, 2023 | (Italy) 2023 CS Lombardia Trophy | 2 | 63.27 | 2 | 117.51 | 3 | 180.78 |
| Sep 28 – 30, 2023 | (Slovakia) 2023 CS Nepela Memorial | 1 | 67.42 | 1 | 134.84 | 1 | 202.26 |
| Oct 27 – 29, 2023 | 2023 Skate Canada International | 2 | 70.31 | 4 | 130.84 | 2 | 201.15 |
| Nov 17 – 19, 2023 | (Finland) 2023 Grand Prix of Espoo | 3 | 66.19 | 4 | 115.23 | 4 | 181.42 |
| Jan 4 – 7, 2024 | (South Korea) 2024 South Korean Championships | 9 | 63.36 | 2 | 141.97 | 3 | 205.33 |
| Jan 30 – Feb 4, 2024 | (China) 2024 Four Continents Championships | 2 | 69.77 | 3 | 134.91 | 2 | 204.68 |
| Mar 18 – 24, 2024 | (Italy) 2024 World Championships | 6 | 66.91 | 3 | 136.68 | 3 | 203.59 |

Results in the 2024–25 season
| Date | Event | SP | | FS | | Total | |
| Date | Event | P | Score | P | Score | P | Score |
|---|---|---|---|---|---|---|---|
| Oct 3 – 5, 2024 | (China) 2024 Shanghai Trophy | 1 | 70.72 | 1 | 144.02 | 1 | 214.74 |
| Oct 16 – 20, 2024 | (France) 2024 CS Trophée Métropole Nice Côte d'Azur | 1 | 69.42 | 1 | 135.25 | 1 | 204.67 |
| Nov 1 – 3, 2024 | 2024 Grand Prix de France | 2 | 70.90 | 5 | 129.09 | 4 | 199.99 |
| Nov 22 – 24, 2024 | 2024 Cup of China | 4 | 69.27 | 3 | 139.20 | 3 | 208.47 |
| Jan 2 – 5, 2024 | (South Korea) 2024 South Korean Championships | 2 | 70.43 | 1 | 145.66 | 1 | 216.09 |
| Feb 11 – 13, 2025 | (China) 2025 Asian Winter Games | 2 | 71.88 | 1 | 147.56 | 1 | 219.44 |
| Feb 19 – 23, 2025 | (China) 2025 Four Continents Championships | 1 | **74.02** | 1 | **148.36** | 1 | **222.38** |
| Mar 25 – 30, 2025 | (United States) 2025 World Championships | 11 | 65.67 | 9 | 128.49 | 10 | 194.16 |

Results in the 2025–26 season
| Date | Event | SP | | FS | | Total | |
| Date | Event | P | Score | P | Score | P | Score |
|---|---|---|---|---|---|---|---|
| Sep 25 – 27, 2025 | (Slovakia) 2025 CS Nepela Memorial | 8 | 56.88 | 14 | 92.08 | 12 | 148.96 |
| Oct 17 – 19, 2025 | 2025 Grand Prix de France | 6 | 62.24 | 6 | 125.35 | 6 | 187.59 |
| Nov 14 – 16, 2025 | (United States) 2025 Skate America | 5 | 67.28 | 6 | 120.94 | 6 | 188.22 |
| Jan 3 – 6, 2026 | (South Korea) 2026 South Korean Championships | 8 | 64.06 | 10 | 118.53 | 9 | 182.59 |

=== Junior level ===
Results in the 2019–20 season
| Date | Event | SP | | FS | | Total | |
| Date | Event | P | Score | P | Score | P | Score |
|---|---|---|---|---|---|---|---|
| Jan 3 – 5, 2020 | (South Korea) 2020 South Korean Championships (Junior) | 4 | 46.08 | 4 | 88.50 | 4 | 134.58 |

Results in the 2020–21 season
| Date | Event | SP | | FS | | Total | |
| Date | Event | P | Score | P | Score | P | Score |
|---|---|---|---|---|---|---|---|
| Feb 24 – 26, 2021 | (South Korea) 2021 South Korean Championships (Senior) | 9 | 60.62 | 11 | 111.49 | 9 | 172.11 |

Results in the 2021–22 season
| Date | Event | SP | | FS | | Total | |
| Date | Event | P | Score | P | Score | P | Score |
|---|---|---|---|---|---|---|---|
| Aug 25 – 28, 2021 | 2021 JGP France II | 2 | 66.90 | 2 | 124.56 | 2 | 191.46 |
| Sep 1 – 4, 2021 | 2021 JGP Slovakia | 5 | 65.17 | 4 | 123.29 | 5 | 188.46 |
| Jan 7 – 9, 2022 | (South Korea) 2022 South Korean Championships (Senior) | 8 | 64.90 | 10 | 120.03 | 8 | 184.93 |

Results in the 2022–23 season
| Date | Event | SP | | FS | | Total | |
| Date | Event | P | Score | P | Score | P | Score |
|---|---|---|---|---|---|---|---|
| Sep 28 – Oct 1, 2021 | 2022 JGP Poland I | 3 | 67.61 | 3 | 127.85 | 3 | 195.46 |
| Oct 10 – 15, 2022 | 2022 JGP Italy | 1 | 70.29 | 2 | 133.65 | 2 | 203.94 |
| Dec 8 – 11, 2022 | (Italy) 2022-23 Junior Grand Prix Final | 3 | 66.71 | 3 | 123.65 | 3 | 190.36 |
