= 2023–24 ISU Challenger Series =

Figure skating competition

- Type: ISU Challenger Series
- Date: September 8 – December 10, 2023
- Season: 2023–24
- Previous: 2022–23 ISU Challenger Series
- Next: 2024–25 ISU Challenger Series

The 2023–24 ISU Challenger Series was held from September to December 2023. It was the tenth season that the ISU Challenger Series, a group of senior-level international figure skating competitions, was held.

== Competitions ==
This season, the series included the following events.

Date	Event	Location	Notes	Results
September 8–10	(Italy) 2023 Lombardia Trophy	Bergamo, Italy		Details
September 14–16	(Canada) 2023 Autumn Classic International	Montreal, Quebec, Canada		Details
September 20–23	(Germany) 2023 Nebelhorn Trophy	Oberstdorf, Germany		Details
September 28–30	(Slovakia) 2023 Nepela Memorial	Bratislava, Slovakia	No pairs	Details
October 4–8	(Finland) 2023 Finlandia Trophy	Espoo, Finland		Details
October 13–15	(Hungary) 2023 Budapest Trophy	Budapest, Hungary	No pairs	Details
November 1–4	(Kazakhstan) 2023 Denis Ten Memorial Challenge	Astana, Kazakhstan	No pairs	Details
November 7–12	(Austria) 2023 Ice Challenge	Cancelled		
November 15–19	(Poland) 2023 Warsaw Cup	Warsaw, Poland	No pairs	Details
December 7–10	(Croatia) 2023 Golden Spin of Zagreb	Sisak, Croatia		Details

== Requirements ==
Skaters were eligible to compete on the Challenger Series if they had reached the age of 16 before July 1, 2023.

== Medal summary ==
=== Men's singles ===
Competition	Gold	Silver	Bronze	Results
(Italy) Lombardia Trophy	(Japan) Yuma Kagiyama	(Georgia (country)) Nika Egadze	(United States) Andrew Torgashev	Details
(Canada) Autumn Classic International	(United States) Ilia Malinin	(France) Kévin Aymoz	(Canada) Stephen Gogolev	Details
(Germany) Nebelhorn Trophy	(France) Adam Siao Him Fa	(Japan) Kazuki Tomono	(Japan) Koshiro Shimada	Details
(Slovakia) Nepela Memorial	(Italy) Gabriele Frangipani	(Georgia (country)) Nika Egadze	(Israel) Mark Gorodnitsky	Details
(Finland) Finlandia Trophy	(Japan) Kao Miura	(Japan) Shun Sato	(Estonia) Aleksandr Selevko	Details
(Hungary) Budapest Trophy	(Italy) Nikolaj Memola	(Switzerland) Lukas Britschgi	(United States) Tomoki Hiwatashi	Details
(Kazakhstan) Denis Ten Memorial Challenge	(South Korea) Lim Ju-heon	(Georgia (country)) Nika Egadze	(South Korea) Kim Han-gil	Details
(Poland) Warsaw Cup	(Switzerland) Lukas Britschgi	(Israel) Mark Gorodnitsky	(United States) Jason Brown	Details
(Croatia) Golden Spin of Zagreb	(China) Jin Boyang	(Kazakhstan) Mikhail Shaidorov	(Estonia) Aleksandr Selevko	Details

=== Women's singles ===
Competition	Gold	Silver	Bronze	Results
(Italy) Lombardia Trophy	(Georgia (country)) Anastasiia Gubanova	(Japan) Hana Yoshida	(South Korea) Kim Chae-yeon	Details
(Canada) Autumn Classic International	(Japan) Kaori Sakamoto	(Canada) Kaiya Ruiter	(Canada) Justine Miclette	Details
(Germany) Nebelhorn Trophy	(United States) Isabeau Levito	(Switzerland) Kimmy Repond	(South Korea) Kim Min-chae	Details
(Slovakia) Nepela Memorial	(South Korea) Kim Chae-yeon	(South Korea) Lee Hae-in	(Canada) Madeline Schizas	Details
(Finland) Finlandia Trophy	(South Korea) Kim Ye-lim	(Japan) Rinka Watanabe	(Georgia (country)) Anastasiia Gubanova	Details
(Hungary) Budapest Trophy	(United States) Bradie Tennell	(France) Léa Serna	(United States) Clare Seo	Details
(Kazakhstan) Denis Ten Memorial Challenge	(Israel) Mariia Seniuk	(South Korea) Choi Da-bin	(Georgia (country)) Alina Urushadze	Details
(Poland) Warsaw Cup	(Poland) Ekaterina Kurakova	(Italy) Anna Pezzetta	(United States) Elyce Lin-Gracey	Details
(Croatia) Golden Spin of Zagreb	(Italy) Sarina Joos	(United States) Amber Glenn	(United States) Starr Andrews	Details

=== Pairs ===
Competition	Gold	Silver	Bronze	Results
(Italy) Lombardia Trophy	(Italy) Sara Conti / Niccolò Macii	(Germany) Minerva Fabienne Hase / Nikita Volodin	(Germany) Annika Hocke / Robert Kunkel	Details
(Canada) Autumn Classic International	(Canada) Deanna Stellato-Dudek / Maxime Deschamps	(Japan) Riku Miura / Ryuichi Kihara	(Canada) Emmanuelle Proft / Nicolas Nadeau	Details
(Germany) Nebelhorn Trophy	(Germany) Minerva Fabienne Hase / Nikita Volodin	(Italy) Lucrezia Beccari / Matteo Guarise	(Germany) Annika Hocke / Robert Kunkel	Details
(Finland) Finlandia Trophy	(United States) Ellie Kam / Danny O'Shea	(Italy) Rebecca Ghilardi / Filippo Ambrosini	(Hungary) Maria Pavlova / Alexei Sviatchenko	Details
(Croatia) Golden Spin of Zagreb	(Finland) Milania Väänänen / Filippo Clerici	(United States) Valentina Plazas / Maximiliano Fernandez	(Ukraine) Sofiia Holichenko / Artem Darenskyi	Details

=== Ice dance ===
Competition	Gold	Silver	Bronze	Results
(Italy) Lombardia Trophy	(Italy) Charlène Guignard / Marco Fabbri	(Czech Republic) Natálie Taschlerová / Filip Taschler	(Georgia (country)) Maria Kazakova / Georgy Reviya	Details
(Canada) Autumn Classic International	(United States) Eva Pate / Logan Bye	(France) Evgeniia Lopareva / Geoffrey Brissaud	(South Korea) Hannah Lim / Ye Quan	Details
(Germany) Nebelhorn Trophy	(United Kingdom) Lilah Fear / Lewis Gibson	(Lithuania) Allison Reed / Saulius Ambrulevicius	(Finland) Juulia Turkkila / Matthias Versluis	Details
(Slovakia) Nepela Memorial	(United Kingdom) Lilah Fear / Lewis Gibson	(Georgia (country)) Diana Davis / Gleb Smolkin	(Czech Republic) Natálie Taschlerová / Filip Taschler	Details
(Finland) Finlandia Trophy	(Finland) Juulia Turkkila / Matthias Versluis	(United States) Christina Carreira / Anthony Ponomarenko	(Canada) Laurence Fournier Beaudry / Nikolaj Sørensen	Details
(Hungary) Budapest Trophy	(Georgia (country)) Diana Davis / Gleb Smolkin	(Canada) Marie-Jade Lauriault / Romain Le Gac	(France) Loïcia Demougeot / Théo Le Mercier	Details
(Kazakhstan) Denis Ten Memorial Challenge	(Georgia (country)) Diana Davis / Gleb Smolkin	(Germany) Jennifer Janse van Rensburg / Benjamin Steffan	(Ukraine) Mariia Pinchuk / Mykyta Pogorielov	Details
(Poland) Warsaw Cup	(France) Evgeniia Lopareva / Geoffrey Brissaud	(South Korea) Hannah Lim / Ye Quan	(France) Marie Dupayage / Thomas Nabais	Details
(Croatia) Golden Spin of Zagreb	(Lithuania) Allison Reed / Saulius Ambrulevičius	(United States) Emilea Zingas / Vadym Kolesnik	(United States) Isabella Flores / Ivan Desyatov	Details

=== Medal standings ===
Rank	Nation	Gold	Silver	Bronze	Total
1	United States	5	4	7	16
2	Italy	5	3	0	8
3	Japan	3	5	1	9
4	Georgia	3	4	3	10
5	South Korea	3	3	4	10
6	France	2	3	2	7
7	Finland	2	0	1	3
8	Great Britain	2	0	0	2
9	Canada	1	2	5	8
10	Germany	1	2	2	5
11	Switzerland	1	2	0	3
12	Israel	1	1	1	3
13	Lithuania	1	1	0	2
14	China	1	0	0	1
14	Poland	1	0	0	1
16	Czech Republic	0	1	1	2
17	Kazakhstan	0	1	0	1
18	Estonia	0	0	2	2
18	Ukraine	0	0	2	2
20	Hungary	0	0	1	1
Totals (20 entries)		32	32	32	96

== Challenger Series rankings ==
The ISU Challenger Series rankings were formed by combining the two highest final scores of each skater or team.

=== Men's singles ===
As of December 29, 2023.

No.	Skater	Nation	First event	Score	Second event	Score	Total score
1	Lukas Britschgi	Switzerland	Budapest Trophy	246.12	Warsaw Cup	246.22	492.34
2	Jin Boyang	China	Autumn Classic International	230.99	Golden Spin of Zagreb	258.67	489.66
3	Nika Egadze	Georgia	Lombardia Trophy	243.35	Nepela Memorial	243.31	486.66
4	Mark Gorodnitsky	Israel	Nepela Memorial	236.30	Warsaw Cup	243.29	479.59
5	Nikolaj Memola	Italy	Finlandia Trophy	222.98	Budapest Trophy	250.37	473.35

=== Women's singles ===
As of December 29, 2023.

No.	Skater	Nation	First event	Score	Second event	Score	Total score
1	Kim Chae-yeon	South Korea	Lombardia Trophy	180.78	Nepela Memorial	202.26	383.04
2	Anastasiia Gubanova	Georgia	Lombardia Trophy	185.60	Finlandia Trophy	179.61	365.21
3	Ekaterina Kurakova	Poland	Nepela Memorial	181.98	Warsaw Cup	181.71	363.69
4	Léa Serna	France	Budapest Trophy	178.56	Warsaw Cup	174.59	353.15
5	Livia Kaiser	Switzerland	Budapest Trophy	170.39	Warsaw Cup	173.20	343.59

=== Pairs ===
As of December 29, 2023.

No.	Team	Nation	First event	Score	Second event	Score	Total score
1	Minerva Fabienne Hase / Nikita Volodin	Germany	Lombardia Trophy	194.52	Nebelhorn Trophy	194.96	389.48
2	Annika Hocke / Robert Kunkel	Germany	Lombardia Trophy	191.76	Nebelhorn Trophy	189.01	380.77
3	Lucrezia Beccari / Matteo Guarise	Italy	Lombardia Trophy	185.06	Nebelhorn Trophy	191.71	376.77
4	Rebecca Ghilardi / Filippo Ambrosini	Italy	Lombardia Trophy	182.33	Finlandia Trophy	177.03	359.36
5	Maria Pavlova / Alexei Sviatchenko	Hungary	Nebelhorn Trophy	182.60	Finlandia Trophy	169.39	351.99

=== Ice dance ===
As of December 29, 2023.

No.	Team	Nation	First event	Score	Second event	Score	Total score
1	Lilah Fear / Lewis Gibson	Great Britain	Nebelhorn Trophy	207.84	Nepela Memorial	200.46	408.30
2	Allison Reed / Saulius Ambrulevičius	Lithuania	Nebelhorn Trophy	190.55	Golden Spin of Zagreb	200.11	390.66
3	Diana Davis / Gleb Smolkin	Georgia	Budapest Trophy	191.84	Denis Ten Memorial Challenge	192.67	384.51
4	Evgenia Lopareva / Geoffrey Brissaud	France	Autumn Classic International	186.94	Warsaw Cup	196.56	383.50
5	Juulia Turkkila / Matthias Versluis	Finland	Nebelhorn Trophy	183.63	Finlandia Trophy	193.73	377.36

== Top scores ==
=== Men's singles ===
Top 10 best scores in the men's combined total
No.	Skater	Nation	Score	Event
1	Ilia Malinin	United States	281.68	2023 Autumn Classic International
2	Adam Siao Him Fa	France	279.57	2023 Nebelhorn Trophy
3	Kao Miura	Japan	267.81	2023 Finlandia Trophy
4	Kazuki Tomono	Japan	265.78	2023 Nebelhorn Trophy
5	Yuma Kagiyama	Japan	265.59	2023 Lombardia Trophy
6	Shun Sato	Japan	261.23	2023 Finlandia Trophy
7	Jin Boyang	China	258.67	2023 Golden Spin of Zagreb
8	Nikolaj Memola	Italy	250.37	2023 Budapest Trophy
9	Koshiro Shimada	Japan	247.43	2023 Nebelhorn Trophy
10	Lukas Britschgi	Switzerland	246.22	2023 Warsaw Cup

Top 10 best scores in the men's short program
No.	Skater	Nation	Score	Event
1	Ilia Malinin	United States	100.87	2023 Autumn Classic International
2	Adam Siao Him Fa	France	95.17	2023 Nebelhorn Trophy
3	Kazuki Tomono	Japan	93.55	2023 Nebelhorn Trophy
4	Lukas Britschgi	Switzerland	91.51	2023 Warsaw Cup
5	Yuma Kagiyama	Japan	91.47	2023 Lombardia Trophy
6	Jin Boyang	China	91.25	2023 Golden Spin of Zagreb
7	Kao Miura	Japan	90.95	2023 Finlandia Trophy
8	Nikolaj Memola	Italy	88.99	2023 Budapest Trophy
9	Shun Sato	Japan	87.47	2023 Finlandia Trophy
10	Andrew Torgashev	United States	86.41	2023 Lombardia Trophy

Top 10 best scores in the men's free skating
No.	Skater	Nation	Score	Event
1	Adam Siao Him Fa	France	184.40	2023 Nebelhorn Trophy
2	Ilia Malinin	United States	180.81	2023 Autumn Classic International
3	Kao Miura	Japan	176.86	2023 Finlandia Trophy
4	Yuma Kagiyama	Japan	174.12	2023 Lombardia Trophy
5	Shun Sato	Japan	173.76	2023 Finlandia Trophy
6	Kazuki Tomono	Japan	172.23	2023 Nebelhorn Trophy
7	Lukas Britschgi	Switzerland	168.34	2023 Budapest Trophy
8	Koshiro Shimada	Japan	167.86	2023 Nebelhorn Trophy
9	Jin Boyang	China	167.42	2023 Golden Spin of Zagreb
10	Gabriele Frangipani	Italy	164.87	2023 Nepela Memorial

=== Women's singles ===
Top 10 best scores in the women's combined total
No.	Skater	Nation	Score	Event
1	Kaori Sakamoto	Japan	203.20	2023 Autumn Classic International
2	Kim Chae-yeon	South Korea	202.26	2023 Nepela Memorial
3	Isabeau Levito	United States	198.79	2023 Nebelhorn Trophy
4	Kimmy Repond	Switzerland	191.94	2023 Nebelhorn Trophy
5	Lee Hae-in	South Korea	191.10	2023 Nepela Memorial
6	Madeline Schizas	Canada	188.88	2023 Nepela Memorial
7	Kim Ye-lim	South Korea	187.91	2023 Finlandia Trophy
8	Bradie Tennell	United States	185.84	2023 Budapest Trophy
9	Anastasiia Gubanova	Georgia	185.60	2023 Lombardia Trophy
10	Hana Yoshida	Japan	185.45	2023 Lombardia Trophy

Top 10 best scores in the women's short program
No.	Skater	Nation	Score	Event
1	Kaori Sakamoto	Japan	75.62	2023 Autumn Classic International
2	Kim Ye-lim	South Korea	70.20	2023 Finlandia Trophy
3	Anastasiia Gubanova	Georgia	69.65	2023 Lombardia Trophy
4	Isabeau Levito	United States	69.30	2023 Nebelhorn Trophy
5	Kim Chae-yeon	South Korea	67.42	2023 Nepela Memorial
5	Madeline Schizas	Canada	67.42	2023 Nepela Memorial
7	Lee Hae-in	South Korea	66.08	2023 Nepela Memorial
8	Livia Kaiser	Switzerland	65.21	2023 Warsaw Cup
9	Bradie Tennell	United States	65.09	2023 Budapest Trophy
10	Ava Marie Ziegler	United States	65.07	2023 Finlandia Trophy

Top 10 best scores in the women's free skating
No.	Skater	Nation	Score	Event
1	Kim Chae-yeon	South Korea	134.84	2023 Nepela Memorial
2	Kimmy Repond	Switzerland	130.39	2023 Nebelhorn Trophy
3	Isabeau Levito	United States	129.49	2023 Nebelhorn Trophy
4	Kaori Sakamoto	Japan	127.58	2023 Autumn Classic International
5	Lee Hae-in	South Korea	125.02	2023 Nepela Memorial
6	Ekaterina Kurakova	Poland	124.26	2023 Warsaw Cup
7	Hana Yoshida	Japan	122.91	2023 Lombardia Trophy
8	Madeline Schizas	Canada	121.46	2023 Nepela Memorial
9	Kim Min-chae	South Korea	121.27	2023 Nebelhorn Trophy
10	Bradie Tennell	United States	120.75	2023 Budapest Trophy

=== Pairs ===
Top 10 best scores in the pairs' combined total
No.	Team	Nation	Score	Event
1	Deanna Stellato-Dudek / Maxime Deschamps	Canada	203.62	2023 Autumn Classic International
2	Sara Conti / Niccolò Macii	Italy	200.35	2023 Lombardia Trophy
3	Minerva Fabienne Hase / Nikita Volodin	Germany	194.96	2023 Nebelhorn Trophy
4	Annika Hocke / Robert Kunkel	Germany	191.76	2023 Lombardia Trophy
5	Lucrezia Beccari / Matteo Guarise	Italy	191.71	2023 Nebelhorn Trophy
6	Lia Pereira / Trennt Michaud	Canada	188.94	2023 Nebelhorn Trophy
7	Riku Miura / Ryuichi Kihara	Japan	188.05	2023 Autumn Classic International
8	Maria Pavlova / Alexei Sviatchenko	Hungary	182.60	2023 Nebelhorn Trophy
9	Rebecca Ghilardi / Filippo Ambrosini	Italy	182.33	2023 Lombardia Trophy
10	Ellie Kam / Danny O'Shea	United States	182.07	2023 Finlandia Trophy

Top 10 best scores in the pairs' short program
No.	Team	Nation	Score	Event
1	Deanna Stellato-Dudek / Maxime Deschamps	Canada	71.80	2023 Autumn Classic International
2	Sara Conti / Niccolò Macii	Italy	70.16	2023 Lombardia Trophy
3	Lucrezia Beccari / Matteo Guarise	Italy	66.94	2023 Lombardia Trophy
4	Minerva Fabienne Hase / Nikita Volodin	Germany	66.22	2023 Lombardia Trophy
5	Annika Hocke / Robert Kunkel	Germany	66.06	2023 Lombardia Trophy
6	Ellie Kam / Danny O'Shea	United States	63.03	2023 Finlandia Trophy
7	Lia Pereira / Trennt Michaud	Canada	62.38	2023 Nebelhorn Trophy
8	Rebecca Ghilardi / Filippo Ambrosini	Italy	61.75	2023 Finlandia Trophy
9	Maria Pavlova / Alexei Sviatchenko	Hungary	61.66	2023 Finlandia Trophy
10	Milania Väänänen / Filippo Clerici	Finland	60.95	2023 Golden Spin of Zagreb

Top 10 best scores in the pairs' free skating
No.	Team	Nation	Score	Event
1	Minerva Fabienne Hase / Nikita Volodin	Germany	132.11	2023 Nebelhorn Trophy
2	Deanna Stellato-Dudek / Maxime Deschamps	Canada	131.82	2023 Autumn Classic International
3	Sara Conti / Niccolò Macii	Italy	130.19	2023 Lombardia Trophy
4	Riku Miura / Ryuichi Kihara	Japan	128.92	2023 Autumn Classic International
5	Rebecca Ghilardi / Filippo Ambrosini	Italy	127.34	2023 Lombardia Trophy
6	Lia Pereira / Trennt Michaud	Canada	126.56	2023 Nebelhorn Trophy
7	Annika Hocke / Robert Kunkel	Germany	125.70	2023 Lombardia Trophy
8	Lucrezia Beccari / Matteo Guarise	Italy	125.35	2023 Nebelhorn Trophy
9	Maria Pavlova / Alexei Sviatchenko	Hungary	121.26	2023 Nebelhorn Trophy
10	Ellie Kam / Danny O'Shea	United States	119.04	2023 Finlandia Trophy

=== Ice dance ===
Top 10 best scores in the combined total (ice dance)
No.	Team	Nation	Score	Event
1	Charlène Guignard / Marco Fabbri	Italy	208.02	2023 Lombardia Trophy
2	Lilah Fear / Lewis Gibson	Great Britain	207.84	2023 Nebelhorn Trophy
3	Allison Reed / Saulius Ambrulevičius	Lithuania	200.11	2023 Golden Spin of Zagreb
4	Juulia Turkkila / Matthias Versluis	Finland	193.73	2023 Finlandia Trophy
5	Diana Davis / Gleb Smolkin	Georgia	192.67	2023 Denis Ten Memorial
6	Eva Pate / Logan Bye	United States	191.20	2023 Autumn Classic International
7	Christina Carreira / Anthony Ponomarenko	United States	191.14	2023 Finlandia Trophy
8	Natálie Taschlerová / Filip Taschler	Czech Republic	189.23	2023 Lombardia Trophy
9	Laurence Fournier Beaudry / Nikolaj Sørensen	Canada	188.56	2023 Finlandia Trophy
10	Marie-Jade Lauriault / Romain Le Gac	Canada	188.32	2023 Budapest Trophy

Top 10 best scores in the rhythm dance
No.	Team	Nation	Score	Event
1	Charlène Guignard / Marco Fabbri	Italy	84.61	2023 Lombardia Trophy
2	Lilah Fear / Lewis Gibson	Great Britain	82.42	2023 Nebelhorn Trophy
3	Allison Reed / Saulius Ambrulevičius	Lithuania	81.19	2023 Golden Spin of Zagreb
4	Emilea Zingas / Vadym Kolesnik	United States	78.23	2023 Golden Spin of Zagreb
5	Diana Davis / Gleb Smolkin	Georgia	77.62	2023 Nepela Memorial
6	Eva Pate / Logan Bye	United States	77.02	2023 Autumn Classic International
7	Juulia Turkkila / Matthias Versluis	Finland	75.76	2023 Finlandia Trophy
8	Natálie Taschlerová / Filip Taschler	Czech Republic	75.21	2023 Lombardia Trophy
9	Christina Carreira / Anthony Ponomarenko	United States	74.15	2023 Finlandia Trophy
10	Olivia Smart / Tim Dieck	Spain	72.56	2023 Finlandia Trophy

Top 10 best scores in the free dance
No.	Team	Nation	Score	Event
1	Lilah Fear / Lewis Gibson	Great Britain	125.42	2023 Nebelhorn Trophy
2	Charlène Guignard / Marco Fabbri	Italy	123.41	2023 Lombardia Trophy
3	Laurence Fournier Beaudry / Nikolaj Sørensen	Canada	120.89	2023 Finlandia Trophy
4	Allison Reed / Saulius Ambrulevičius	Lithuania	118.92	2023 Golden Spin of Zagreb
5	Juulia Turkkila / Matthias Versluis	Finland	117.97	2023 Finlandia Trophy
6	Christina Carreira / Anthony Ponomarenko	United States	116.99	2023 Finlandia Trophy
7	Diana Davis / Gleb Smolkin	Georgia	116.63	2023 Budapest Trophy
8	Marie-Jade Lauriault / Romain Le Gac	Canada	116.40	2023 Budapest Trophy
9	Evgeniia Lopareva / Geoffrey Brissaud	France	114.66	2023 Autumn Classic International
10	Eva Pate / Logan Bye	United States	114.18	2023 Autumn Classic International
