= 2023 CS Nepela Memorial =

Figure skating competition

- Type: ISU Challenger Series
- Date: September 28 – 30
- Season: 2023–24
- Location: Bratislava, Slovakia
- Host: Slovak Figure Skating Association
- Venue: Ondrej Nepela Arena

Champions
- Men's singles: (Italy) Gabriele Frangipani
- Women's singles: (South Korea) Kim Chae-yeon
- Ice dance: (United Kingdom) Lilah Fear / Lewis Gibson
- Previous: 2022 CS Nepela Memorial
- Next: 2024 CS Nepela Memorial
- Previous CS: 2023 CS Nebelhorn Trophy
- Next CS: 2023 CS Finlandia Trophy

The 2023 CS Nepela Memorial was held on September 28–30, 2023, in Bratislava, Slovakia. It was part of the 2023–24 ISU Challenger Series. Medals were awarded in men's singles, women's singles, and ice dance.

== Entries ==
The International Skating Union published the list of entries on September 5, 2023.

Country	Men	Women	Ice dance
Belgium			Olivia Shilling / Léo Baetan
Bulgaria	Filip Kaymakchiev		
Canada	Conrad Orzel	Madeline Schizas	Nadiia Bashynska / Peter Beaumont; Marjorie Lajoie / Zachary Lagha
Czech Republic		Michaela Vrašťáková	Natálie Taschlerová / Filip Taschler
Finland			Yuka Orihara / Juho Pirinen
Georgia	Nika Egadze		Diana Davis / Gleb Smolkin
Germany	Denis Gurdzhi		Charise Matthaei / Max Liebers
Great Britain	Henry Privett-Mendoza	Nina Povey	Phebe Bekker / James Hernandez; Lilah Fear / Lewis Gibson
Hungary	Aleksandr Vlasenko	Dária Zsirnov	
Israel	Mark Gorodnitsky		
Italy	Gabriele Frangipani	Lara Naki Gutmann	
Kazakhstan	Mikhail Shaidorov		
Latvia	Fedir Kulish; Deniss Vasiļjevs	Sofja Stepčenko	
Lithuania		Jogailė Aglinskytė; Aleksandra Golovkina; Meda Variakojyte	Paulina Ramanauskaitė / Deividas Kizala
Poland	Vladimir Samoilov; Kornel Witkowski; Miłosz Witkowski	Ekaterina Kurakova	Olivia Oliver / Filip Bojanowski
Romania		Julia Sauter	
Slovakia	Adam Hagara; Lukas Vaclavik	Vanesa Šelmeková	Mária Sofia Pucherová / Nikita Lysak; Anna Šimová / Kirill Aksenov
South Korea	Cha Jun-hwan; Kim Hyun-gyeom	Kim Chae-yeon; Lee Hae-in; You Young	
Spain			Sofía Val / Asaf Kazimov
Switzerland		Sara Franzi	
Ukraine	Ivan Shmuratko	Yelizaveta Babenko; Anastasia Gozhva	Mariia Holubtsova / Kyryl Bielobrov
United States	Maxim Naumov		Emilea Zingas / Vadym Kolesnik

=== Changes to preliminary assignments ===
Date	Discipline	Withdrew	Ref.
September 7	Men	(Israel) Lev Vinokur	
September 7	Women	(Israel) Ella Chen	
September 7	Women	(Czech Republic) Nikola Rychtaříková	
September 13	Ice dance	(United States) Caroline Green / Michael Parsons	
September 19	Women	(Slovakia) Ema Doboszová	
September 20	Women	(United States) Amber Glenn	
September 25	Women	(Serbia) Antonina Dubinina	
September 25	Ice dance	(Israel) Mariia Nosovitskaya / Mikhail Nosovitskiy	
September 27	Women	(Israel) Mariia Seniuk	
September 27	Women	(Hungary) Júlia Láng	
September 29	Men	(Italy) Daniel Grassl	

== Results ==
=== Men's singles ===
Rank	Skater	Nation	Total points	SP		FS	
1st place, gold medalist(s)	Gabriele Frangipani	Italy	243.91	6	79.04	1	164.87
2nd place, silver medalist(s)	Nika Egadze	Georgia	243.31	1	84.11	2	159.20
3rd place, bronze medalist(s)	Mark Gorodnitsky	Israel	236.30	4	80.55	3	155.75
4	Kim Hyun-gyeom	South Korea	230.46	8	75.24	4	155.22
5	Adam Hagara	Slovakia	222.78	9	74.27	5	148.51
6	Cha Jun-hwan	South Korea	222.16	2	83.91	7	138.25
7	Deniss Vasiļjevs	Latvia	215.78	3	82.40	10	133.38
8	Ivan Shmuratko	Ukraine	215.68	10	72.14	6	143.54
9	Conrad Orzel	Canada	213.52	7	77.45	9	136.07
10	Vladimir Samoilov	Poland	213.10	5	79.76	11	133.34
11	Maxim Naumov	United States	201.71	11	70.05	12	131.66
12	Kornel Witkowski	Poland	198.68	12	62.46	8	136.22
13	Miłosz Witkowski	Poland	176.75	15	58.56	13	118.19
14	Aleksandr Vlasenko	Hungary	174.50	13	59.97	14	114.53
15	Fedir Kulish	Latvia	165.04	17	54.98	15	110.06
16	Denis Gurdzhi	Germany	158.42	14	59.15	16	100.27
17	Henry Privett-Mendoza	Great Britain	143.06	18	48.76	17	94.30
18	Lukas Vaclavik	Slovakia	139.69	16	55.25	18	84.44
19	Filip Kaymakchiev	Bulgaria	123.19	19	42.12	19	81.07
WD	Mikhail Shaidorov	Kazakhstan	withdrew from competition				

=== Women's singles ===
Rank	Skater	Nation	Total points	SP		FS	
1st place, gold medalist(s)	Kim Chae-yeon	South Korea	202.26	1	67.42	1	134.84
2nd place, silver medalist(s)	Lee Hae-in	South Korea	191.10	3	66.08	2	125.02
3rd place, bronze medalist(s)	Madeline Schizas	Canada	188.88	2	67.42	4	121.46
4	Ekaterina Kurakova	Poland	181.98	5	57.87	3	124.11
5	You Young	South Korea	181.80	4	63.88	5	117.92
6	Julia Sauter	Romania	163.64	6	55.55	6	108.09
7	Lara Naki Gutmann	Italy	157.73	7	52.78	7	104.95
8	Vanesa Šelmeková	Slovakia	152.59	11	49.70	8	102.89
9	Meda Varakojyte	Lithuania	152.58	10	50.34	9	102.24
10	Nina Povey	Great Britain	147.99	8	51.18	10	96.81
11	Aleksandra Golovkina	Lithuania	143.99	9	51.17	12	92.82
12	Sofja Stepčenko	Latvia	142.23	15	47.48	11	94.75
13	Anastasia Gozhva	Ukraine	134.21	13	49.04	13	85.17
14	Sara Franzi	Switzerland	133.35	14	48.83	14	84.52
15	Dária Zsirnov	Hungary	127.70	12	49.16	17	78.54
16	Jogailė Aglinskytė	Lithuania	124.90	16	45.90	16	79.00
17	Yelizveta Babenko	Ukraine	118.37	18	39.07	15	79.30
18	Michaela Vrašťáková	Czech Republic	115.18	17	42.79	18	72.39

=== Ice dance ===
Rank	Team	Nation	Total points	RD		FD	
1st place, gold medalist(s)	Lilah Fear / Lewis Gibson	Great Britain	200.46	1	81.69	1	118.77
2nd place, silver medalist(s)	Diana Davis / Gleb Smolkin	Georgia	188.94	2	77.62	4	111.32
3rd place, bronze medalist(s)	Natálie Taschlerová / Filip Taschler	Czech Republic	187.34	4	74.34	2	113.00
4	Emilea Zingas / Vadym Kolesnik	United States	187.28	3	75.61	3	111.67
5	Marjorie Lajoie / Zachary Lagha	Canada	179.18	5	70.00	5	109.18
6	Yuka Orihara / Juho Pirinen	Finland	171.53	7	65.62	6	105.91
7	Nadiia Bashynska / Peter Beaumont	Canada	164.81	6	67.25	9	97.56
8	Phebe Bekker / James Hernandez	Great Britain	162.22	8	63.90	7	98.32
9	Mariia Holubtsova / Kyryl Bielobrov	Ukraine	161.71	9	63.56	8	98.15
10	Anna Šimová / Kirill Aksenov	Slovakia	151.58	10	59.64	10	91.94
11	Charise Matthaei / Max Liebers	Germany	145.76	11	57.75	12	88.01
12	Mária Sofia Pucherová / Nikita Lysak	Slovakia	145.67	12	57.38	11	88.29
13	Sofía Val / Asaf Kazimov	Spain	143.88	13	56.96	13	86.92
14	Paulina Ramanauskaitė / Deividas Kizala	Lithuania	134.16	14	52.30	14	81.86
15	Olivia Shilling / Léo Baetan	Belgium	130.11	15	51.84	15	78.27
16	Olivia Oliver / Filip Bojanowski	Poland	128.78	16	51.77	16	77.01
