= Vladimir Samoilov (figure skater) =

Russian-Polish figure skater (born 1999)

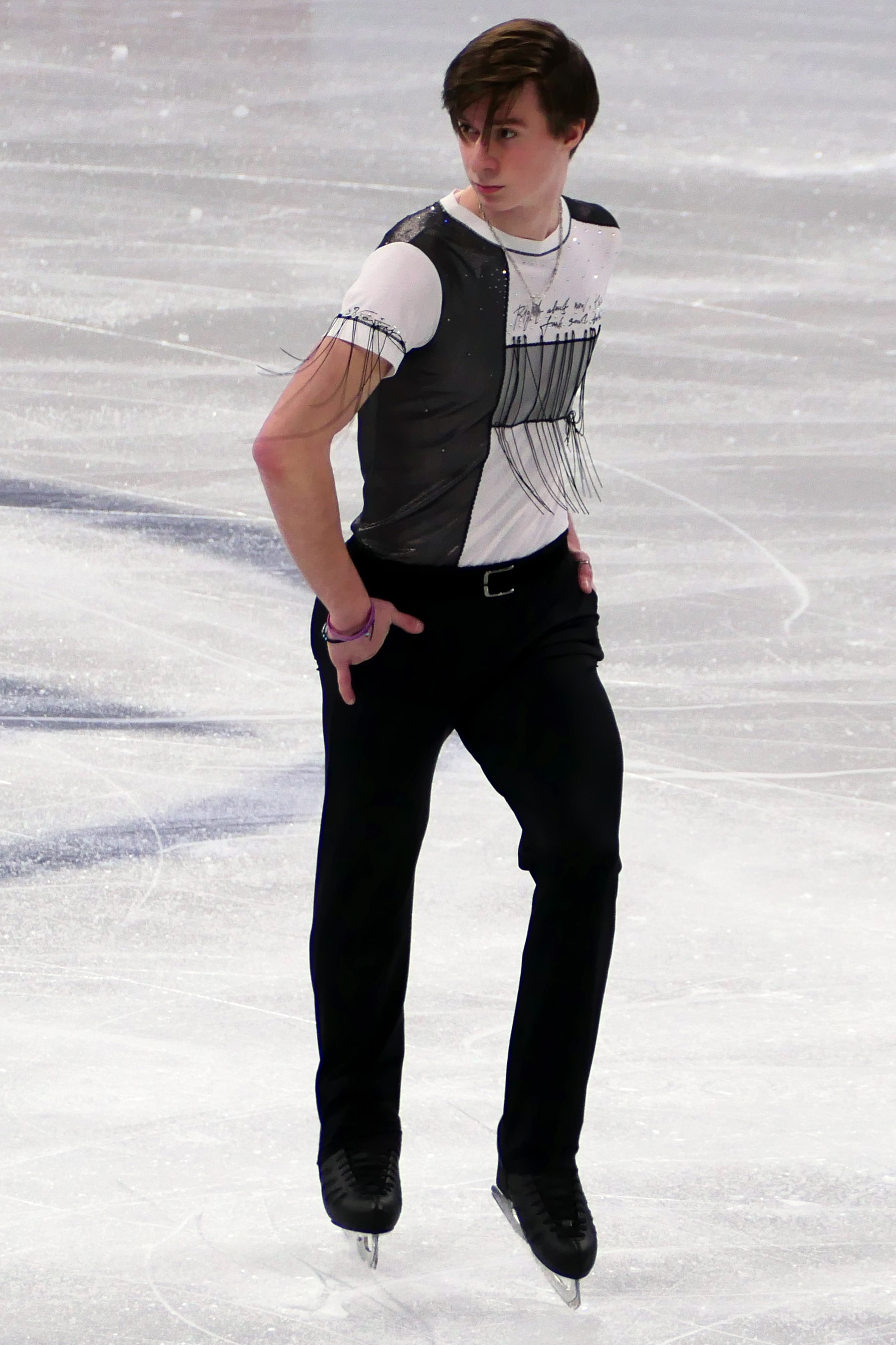
- Vladimir Samoilov at the 2024 World Championships

Personal information
- Native name: Владимир Сергеевич Самойлов (Russian)
- Full name: Vladimir Sergeevich Samoilov
- Other names: Samoylov
- Born: 13 May 1999 (age 27) Moscow, Russia
- Height: 1.80 m (5 ft 11 in)

Figure skating career
- Country: Poland (since 2021); Russia (2012–20)
- Discipline: Men's singles
- Coach: Angelina Turenko; Alisa Mikonsaari
- Skating club: Ice Lab
- Began skating: 2003

Medal record
Representing Poland
Polish Championships
Gold medal – first place	2022 Spišská Nová Ves	Singles
Gold medal – first place	2023 Budapest	Singles
Gold medal – first place	2024 Turnov	Singles
Gold medal – first place	2025 Cieszyn	Singles
Gold medal – first place	2026 Presov	Singles

Vladimir Sergeevich Samoilov (Russian: Владимир Сергеевич Самойлов, Polish: Władimir Samojłow; born 13 May 1999) is a Russian-born Polish figure skater. He is a two-time Challenger Series gold medalist and a five-time Polish national champion (2022–26).

He represented Poland at the 2026 Winter Olympics.

== Personal life ==
Samoilov was born on 13 May 1999 in Moscow, Russia. He has an older sister, Katerina, who is a figure skating coach.

== Career ==
=== Early career ===
Samoilov began skating in 2003 at CSKA Sports School in Moscow under coach Irina Galustyan. He remained with Galustyan until 2009, after which he changed coaches several times, moving to Elena Sokolova for the 2009–2010 season, Anastasia Timofeeva for the 2010–2011 season, and Irina Smirnova for the summer of 2011. In December 2011, he moved back to CSKA to train under Inna Goncharenko.

His time with Goncharenko lasted until the 2016–2017 season, after which he moved to Sambo 70 to train under Eteri Tutberidze, Sergei Dudakov, and Daniil Gleikhengauz on the advice of Goncharenko. Samoilov was only in Tutberidze's camp for one season with little success due to a back injury he incurred there, which prevented him from training normally. He contemplated retiring from competition before he eventually moved to Evgeni Plushenko's new Academy Angels of Plushenko in August 2017.

=== 2017–18 season: Junior Grand Prix silver ===
After four years of competition on the ISU Junior Grand Prix circuit, Samoilov earned his first JGP medal in October 2017 at JGP Italy in Egna-Neumarkt. Samoilov won the short program with a score of 77.65 but was third in the free program after a series of falls. He won the silver medal behind Italian skater Matteo Rizzo and ahead of bronze medalist, American Tomoki Hiwatashi.

Samoilov competed next at 2017 Minsk-Arena Ice Star, where he placed first in the junior men's division by a margin of almost 20 points over silver medalist Irakli Maysuradze. He attempted three quadruple jumps in the free program, including one in combination, and successfully completed two.

At the 2018 Russian Figure Skating Championships, Samoilov had his best career finish at the event at the senior level, placing sixth overall – a major improvement over his seventeenth-place finish the year before. As a result of his placement at the event, Samoilov was named onto the Russian senior men's national reserve team for the 2018–2019 season.

=== 2018–19 season ===
Samoilov departed Plushenko's training camp in the summer before the start of the 2018–19 season, following assistant coaches Alexei Vasilevsky and Yulia Lavrenchuk to their new program. He only competed domestically this season, finishing eleventh at the 2019 Russian Figure Skating Championships.

=== 2019–20 season ===
Samoilov again changed coaches before the start of the 2019–20 season, this time moving to train under Viktoria Butsaeva. Under Butsaeva, Samoilov appeared to strengthen his jumps, demonstrating the ability to perform all five different types of quad jumps (4T, 4S, 4Lo, 4F, and 4Lz), as well as difficult combinations such as the triple Axel-triple loop. He again qualified to the 2020 Russian Figure Skating Championships through the domestic Cup of Russia system but was only able to finish fifteenth overall after a disastrous short program left him initially in seventeenth place.

=== 2020–21 season: End of career for Russia ===
Samoilov did not compete during the 2020–21 figure skating season but continued to train under Butsaeva. During the season, he displayed impressive jumping feats on social media, including quad Salchow-Euler-quad Salchow and quad Lutz-Euler-quad Salchow combinations. On 18 May 2021, Russian media outlets began reporting that Samoilov had put in a request with the Russian Figure Skating Federation for a transfer to represent Poland. Samoilov confirmed the transition in an interview with Sport-Express.ru. The transfer process, in actuality, began in 2019.

=== 2021–22 season: Debut for Poland and first national title ===
Due to his transfer to represent Poland, Samoilov was banned from training in Russia by the Russian Figure Skating Federation and was forced to leave coach Viktoria Butsaeva. He began training in Egna, Italy, with coaches Lorenzo Magri and Angelina Turenko in October 2021. He was scheduled to make his domestic debut representing Poland at the Federation's season-opening event in early September but withdrew before the start of the competition due to inadequate preparation time. He later received his first international assignment for Poland, the 2021 CS Golden Spin of Zagreb, replacing French skater Adam Siao Him Fa after he withdrew from the event. In Zagreb, Samoilov placed fifteenth in the short program after falling on a downgraded triple Axel attempt. His struggles continued in the free skate, where he fell to twenty-first in the segment and eighteenth overall.

The following weekend, Samoilov won his first Polish national title at the 2022 Four National Championships. He placed fourth in the short program due to a fall on a downgraded planned quad Salchow and a popped triple Axel attempt but climbed to second in the free skate by skating a mostly clean program of triple jumps. He placed third in the overall event behind Czech skaters Matyáš Bělohradský and Georgii Reshtenko but finished first of the Polish entrants. Despite his win, Samoilov was only named as first alternate to the Polish men's berth at the 2022 European Championships, with Kornel Witkowski receiving the assignment.

Samoilov next competed at the 2022 Bavarian Open in January. He placed third in the short program after popping his planned quad Salchow to an invalid double but climbed to first in the free skate to take the title ahead of Austria's Luc Maierhofer and Kai Jagoda of Germany.

Samoilov was assigned to Poland's berth in the men's event at the 2022 World Championships in Montpellier in late March. He popped a planned triple Axel into a single in the short program and later fell during his step sequence. He scored 60.71 and did not advance to the free skate, finishing in twenty-seventh place.

=== 2022–23 season ===
Samoilov appeared three times on the Challenger series, coming seventh at the 2022 CS Budapest Trophy, sixth at the 2022 CS Nepela Memorial, and seventh at the 2022 CS Warsaw Cup. He finished first among all skaters at the 2023 Four National Championships, earning a second Polish title.

Making his debut at the European Championships, Samoilov finished sixth in the short program and set a new personal best of 78.26. He dropped to seventeenth after the free skate. Samoilov finished thirty-third at the 2023 World Championships.

=== 2023–24 season ===
Samoilov started the season by competing on the 2023–24 ISU Challenger Series, finishing tenth at the 2023 CS Nepela Memorial, sixth at the 2023 CS Budapest Trophy, and fifth at the 2023 CS Golden Spin of Zagreb. Between the latter two events, Samoilov would also win the 2023 Volvo Open Cup.

In December, he would win the bronze medal at the 2024 Four National Championships behind Adam Hagara and Georgii Reshtenko. Selected to compete at the 2024 European Championships in Kaunas, Lithuania, Samoilov placed sixteenth in the short program but achieved a personal best score in the free skate, placing fifth in that segment and moving up to eighth place overall. He subsequently finished fifth at the 2024 International Challenge Cup.

Samoilov would then compete at the 2024 World Championships in Montreal, Quebec, Canada in March. He placed thirty-first in the short program and did not advance to the free skate segment.

=== 2024–25 season: Grand Prix debut ===
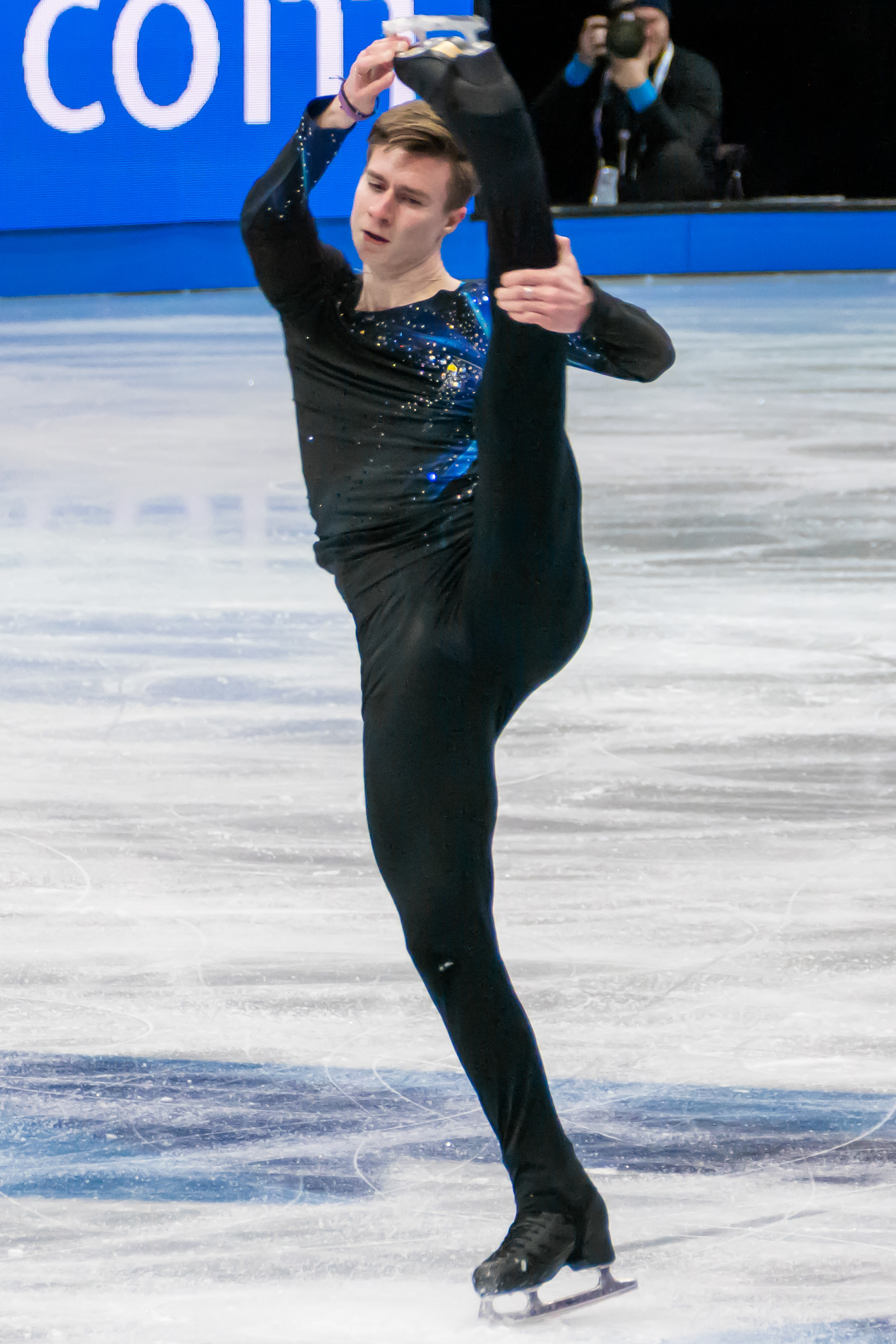
Samoilov performing an I-spin during his free skate at the 2025 World Championships

Samoilov began the season by finishing eighth at the 2024 CS Budapest Trophy. Making his senior ISU Grand Prix debut, Samoilov competed at the 2024 Finlandia Trophy, where he finished eighth. Continuing to compete on the 2024–25 ISU Challenger Series, he won the gold medal at the 2024 CS Warsaw Cup and finished sixth at the 2024 CS Golden Spin of Zagreb.

In mid-December, he won the bronze medal at the 2025 Four National Championships. He then followed this up with a silver medal win at the 2025 Volvo Open Cup.

Selected to compete at the 2025 European Championships in Tallinn, Estonia, Samoilov placed third in the short program, winning a small bronze medal. However, he struggled during the free program, only placing thirteenth in that segment and dropping to tenth place overall. He subsequently finished fifth at the Road to 26 Trophy in Milan, Italy, a test event for the 2026 Winter Olympics.

In March, he competed at the 2025 World Championships held in Boston, Massachusetts, United States, where he finished twenty-third overall. His placement won Poland a quota for men's singles skating at the 2026 Winter Olympics.

=== 2025–26 season: Milano Cortina Olympics ===
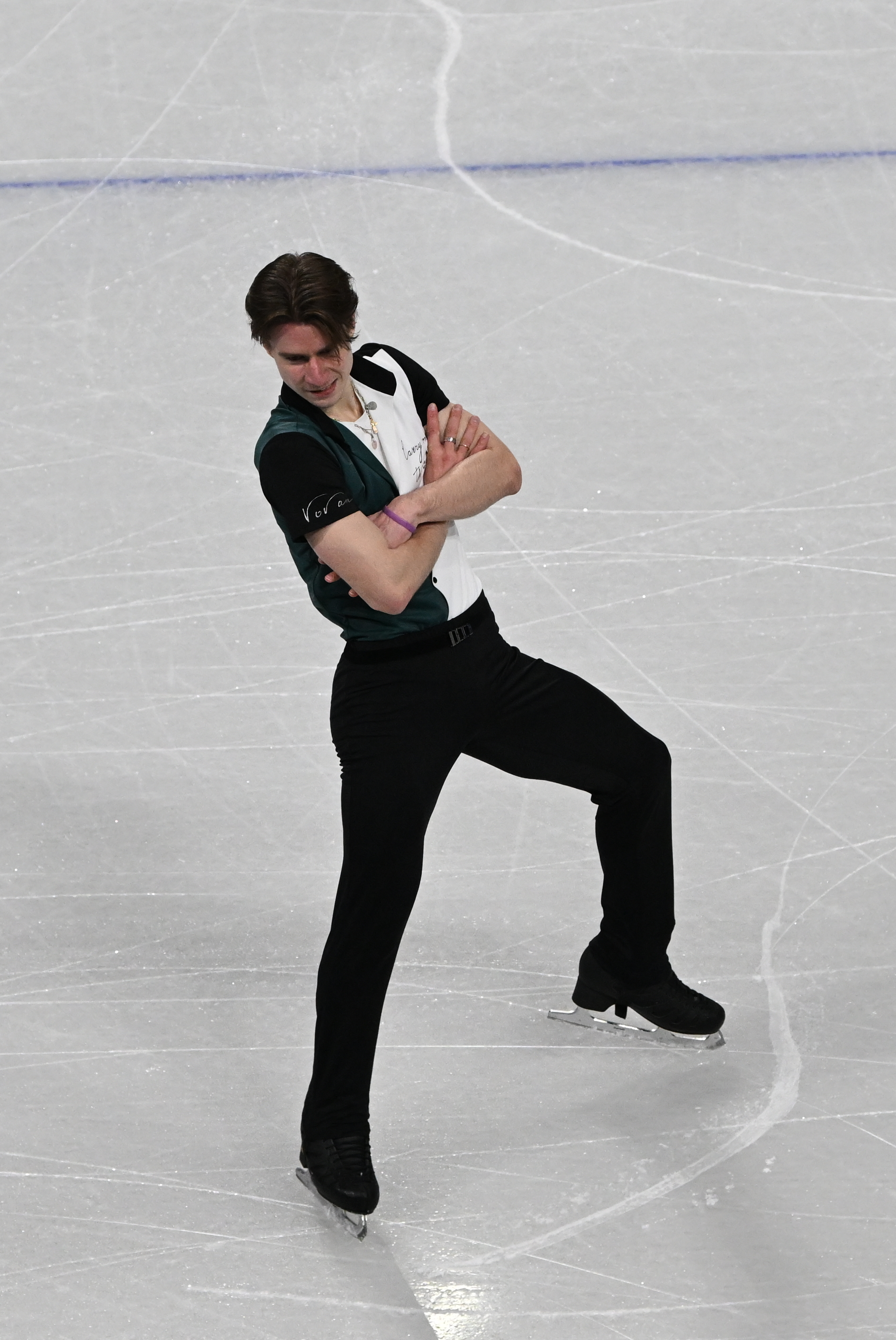
Samoilov at the 2026 Winter Olympics

Samoilov opened his season by competing on 2025–26 ISU Challenger Series, finishing seventh at the 2025 CS Nepela Memorial and fifth at the 2025 CS Trialeti Trophy. He went on to finish eleventh place at 2025 Skate Canada International before winning gold at the 2025 CS Warsaw Cup a couple weeks later.

In December, he won the silver medal at the 2026 Four National Championships. The following month, he finished nineteenth at the 2026 European Championships in Sheffield, England, United Kingdom.

On 7 February, Samoilov placed ninth in the short program in the 2026 Winter Olympics Figure Skating Team Event. "It was good,” he said. “I feel like this was the warm-up before the individual event, so it’s really okay." Team Poland ultimately finished in tenth place overall.

On 10 February, Samoilov competed in the short program segment of the 2026 Winter Olympics – Men's singles event, placing twenty-first. Two days later, he placed seventeenth in the free skate to finish in twenty-first place overall. "There were a lot of emotions, a lot of pressure," he shared in an interview, reflecting on his Olympic experience. "I would have loved to show a clean short program, like in the team event in the individual competition. I also really want to finally show a clean free skate. I feel like I’m ready for that. Hopefully at Worlds."

In March, Samoilov completed his season at the 2026 World Championships. He placed sixteenth in the short program and thirteenth in the free skate, finishing fourteenth overall.

=== 2026–27 season ===
Samoilov began his season at two 2026-27 ISU Challenger Series events, placing seventh at the 2026 CS Nepela Memorial, and placing 11th at the 2026 CS Budapest Trophy. In November, he completed in the 2026 Cup of China, an ISU Grand Prix event, where he placed sixth, setting a new personal best score of 252.39.

== Programs ==
Competition programs by season
Season	Short program	Free skate program
2014–15	"Historia de un amor": Performed by Pérez Prado; Choreo. by Ekaterina Tikhonova	"Hit the Road Jack": Performed by Ray Charles; Choreo. by Ekaterina Tikhonova
2015–16	Notre-Dame de Paris: Composed by Riccardo Cocciante; Choreo. by Ekaterina Tikhonova	Inglourious Basterds: Composed by Ennio Morricone; Choreo. by Ekaterina Tikhonova
2016-17	"What a Wonderful World": Performed by Louis Armstrong; Choreo. by Alexei Vasilevsky	"Caruso": Performed by Julio Iglesias; Choreo. by Alexei Vasilevsky
2017-18	"What a Wonderful World"	"Caruso"
2018-19	"Nemesis": Performed by Benjamin Clementine	"Poeta en el Mar": Performed by Vicente Amigo
2019-20	"The Prophet": Performed by Gary Moore	Ghost: Composed by Dave Stewart, Glen Ballard
2021-22	"Exogenesis: Symphony": Performed by Muse	Ghost
2022-23	"Money": Performed by Pink Floyd; Choreo. by Maksym Spodyriev, Ivan Righini	Notre-Dame de Paris: 1. "Le temps des cathédrales" 2. "Les sans-papiers" 3. "Danse mon Esmeralda"; Composed by Riccardo Cocciante; Choreo. by Maksym Spodyriev, Ivan Righini
2023-24	Fatboy Slim medley: 1. "Weapon of Choice"; 2. "The Rockafeller Skank"; Performed by Fatboy Slim; Choreo. by Ivan Righini	Notre-Dame de Paris
2024-25	Fatboy Slim medley	Rag'n'Bone Man medley: 1. "Lay My Body Down (Orchestra Version)"; 2. "Really Slow Motion Human (Epic Cover)"; Performed by Rag'n'Bone Man; Choreo. by Ivan Righini
2025-26	Medley: 1. "The Power"; Performed by Snap!; 2. "Freestyler"; Performed by Bomfunk MC's; Choreo. by Adam Solya, Lukáš Csölley	Rag'n'Bone Man medley
2026-27	"We Come 1": Performed by Faithless; Choreo. by Adam Solya	Astor Piazzolla medley: 1. "Oblivion"; 2. "Libertango"; 3. "Libertango by BOND"; Composed by Astor Piazzolla; Choreo. by Adam Solya

== Competitive highlights ==
- GP – Event of the ISU Grand Prix Series
- JGP – Event of the ISU Junior Grand Prix Series
- CS – Event of the ISU Challenger Series
- TBD – Assigned
- WD – Withdrew from competition
- Medals at team events are awarded for the team results only. Individual placements at team events are listed in parentheses.

=== Single skating (for Poland) ===
Competition placements at senior level
Season	2021–22	2022–23	2023–24	2024–25	2025–26	2026–27
Winter Olympics					21st	
Winter Olympics (Team event)					10th	
World Championships	27th	33rd	31st	23rd	14th	
European Championships		17th	8th	10th	19th	
Polish Championships (Note: The Polish Championships are contested as part of the Four Nationals Championships.)	1st	1st	1st	1st	1st	
Four Nationals Championships	3rd	1st	3rd	3rd	2nd	
GP Finland				8th		
GP NHK Trophy						TBD
GP Skate Canada					11th	
GP Cup of China						6th
CS Golden Spin of Zagreb	18th		5th	6th		
CS Nepela Memorial		6th	10th		7th	7th
CS Tallinn Trophy						4th
CS Trialeti Trophy					5th	
CS Warsaw Cup		6th		1st	1st	
CS Budapest Trophy		7th	6th	8th		11th
Challenge Cup		12th	5th			
Golden Bear of Zagreb						2nd
Road to 26 Trophy				5th		
Volvo Open Cup		1st	1st	2nd		
Bavarian Open	1st					

=== Single skating (for Russia) ===
Competition placements at junior level
Season	2012–13	2013–14	2014–15	2015–16	2016–17	2017–18	2018–19	2019–20
Russian Championships (Senior)					17th	6th	11th	15th
Russian Championships (Junior)	16th	7th	4th	18th		7th		
JGP Estonia			6th					
JGP Italy						2nd		
JGP Spain				6th				
Ice Star						1st		

== Detailed results ==
ISU personal best scores in the +5/-5 GOE System
Segment	Type	Score	Event
Total	TSS	252.39	2026 Cup of China
Short program	TSS	88.21	2026 Cup of China
Short program	TES	51.56	2026 Cup of China
Short program	PCS	38.07	2025 CS Nepela Memorial
Free skating	TSS	164.18	2026 Cup of China
Free skating	TES	87.70	2026 Cup of China
Free skating	PCS	79.42	2025 CS Warsaw Cup

=== Single skating (for Poland) ===
Results in the 2021–22 season
Date	Event	SP		FS		Total	
Date	Event	P	Score	P	Score	P	Score
Dec 9–11, 2021	(Croatia) 2021 CS Golden Spin of Zagreb	15	68.19	21	122.16	18	190.35
Dec 17–19, 2021	(Slovakia) 2022 Four Nationals Championships	4	58.39	2	129.15	3	180.91
Dec 17–19, 2021	(Poland) 2022 Polish Championships	1	—N/a	1	—N/a	1	—N/a
Jan 18–23, 2022	(Germany) 2022 Bavarian Open	3	73.34	1	138.23	1	211.57
Mar 21–27, 2022	(France) 2022 World Championships	27	60.71	—N/a	—N/a	27	60.71

Results in the 2022–23 season
Date	Event	SP		FS		Total	
Date	Event	P	Score	P	Score	P	Score
Sep 29 – Oct 1, 2022	(Slovakia) 2022 CS Nepela Memorial	6	67.31	6	126.73	6	194.04
Oct 13–16, 2022	(Hungary) 2022 CS Budapest Trophy	8	68.64	6	133.61	7	202.25
Nov 3–4, 2022	(Latvia) 2022 Volvo Open Cup	1	70.83	1	149.34	1	220.17
Nov 17–20, 2022	(Poland) 2022 CS Warsaw Cup	3	77.69	6	135.10	6	212.79
Dec 15–17, 2022	(Hungary) 2023 Four Nationals Championships	1	87.27	2	136.16	1	223.43
Dec 15–17, 2022	(Poland) 2023 Polish Championships	1	—N/a	1	—N/a	1	—N/a
Jan 25–29, 2023	(Finland) 2023 European Championships	6	78.26	21	113.33	17	191.59
Feb 23–26, 2023	(Netherlands) 2023 International Challenge Cup	9	70.90	13	119.74	12	190.64
Mar 22–26, 2023	(Japan) 2023 World Championships	33	61.48	—N/a	—N/a	33	61.48

Results in the 2023–24 season
Date	Event	SP		FS		Total	
Date	Event	P	Score	P	Score	P	Score
Sep 28–30, 2023	(Slovakia) 2023 CS Nepela Memorial	5	79.76	11	133.34	10	213.10
Oct 13–15, 2023	(Hungary) 2023 CS Budapest Trophy	5	75.67	4	140.93	6	216.60
Nov 2–5, 2023	(Latvia) 2023 Volvo Open Cup	1	81.88	2	141.06	1	222.94
Dec 6–9, 2023	(Croatia) 2023 CS Golden Spin of Zagreb	4	69.64	6	132.79	5	202.43
Dec 14–16, 2023	(Czech Republic) 2024 Four Nationals Championships	5	62.64	3	129.37	3	192.01
Dec 14–16, 2023	(Poland) 2024 Polish Championships	1	—N/a	1	—N/a	1	—N/a
Jan 8–14, 2024	(Lithuania) 2024 European Championships	16	71.05	5	159.12	8	230.17
Feb 22–25, 2024	(Netherlands) 2024 International Challenge Cup	6	68.14	5	144.70	6	212.84
Mar 18–24, 2024	(Canada) 2024 World Championships	31	67.81	—N/a	—N/a	31	67.81

Results in the 2024–25 season
Date	Event	SP		FS		Total	
Date	Event	P	Score	P	Score	P	Score
Oct 11–13, 2024	(Hungary) 2024 CS Budapest Trophy	8	60.58	7	115.25	8	175.83
Nov 15–17, 2024	(Finland) 2024 Finlandia Trophy	9	65.46	8	140.01	8	205.47
Nov 20–24, 2024	(Poland) 2024 CS Warsaw Cup	1	84.94	1	148.08	1	233.02
Dec 4–7, 2024	(Croatia) 2024 CS Golden Spin of Zagreb	3	75.99	7	131.76	6	207.75
Dec 13–15, 2024	(Poland) 2025 Four Nationals Championships	2	76.62	4	146.52	3	223.14
Dec 13–15, 2024	(Poland) 2025 Polish Championships	1	—N/a	1	—N/a	1	—N/a
Jan 16–19, 2025	(Latvia) 2025 Volvo Open Cup	1	76.67	4	109.27	2	185.94
Jan 28 – Feb 2, 2025	(Estonia) 2025 European Championships	3	85.98	13	143.69	10	229.67
Feb 18–20, 2025	(Italy) 2025 Road to 26 Trophy	7	67.60	4	152.63	5	220.23
Mar 24–30, 2025	(United States) 2025 World Championships	20	75.73	22	135.95	23	211.68

Results in the 2025–26 season
Date	Event	SP		FS		Total	
Date	Event	P	Score	P	Score	P	Score
Sep 25–27, 2025	(Slovakia) 2025 CS Nepela Memorial	7	76.22	6	145.65	7	221.87
Oct 8–11, 2025	(Georgia (country)) 2025 CS Trialeti Trophy	9	72.32	5	150.00	5	222.32
Oct 31 – Nov 2, 2025	2025 Skate Canada International	11	80.75	10	144.58	11	225.53
Nov 19–23, 2025	(Poland) 2025 CS Warsaw Cup	1	85.08	1	155.75	1	240.83
Dec 11–13, 2025	(Slovakia) 2026 Four Nationals Championships	2	75.55	3	131.39	2	206.94
Dec 11–13, 2025	(Poland) 2026 Polish Championships	1	—N/a	1	—N/a	1	—N/a
Jan 13–18, 2026	(United Kingdom) 2026 European Championships	23	64.55	16	128.94	19	193.49
Feb 6–8, 2026	(Italy) 2026 Winter Olympics – Team event	9	80.47	—N/a	—N/a	10	—N/a
Feb 10–13, 2026	(Italy) 2026 Winter Olympics	21	77.57	17	144.68	21	222.25
Mar 24–29, 2026	(Czech Republic) 2026 World Championships	16	77.98	13	155.43	14	233.41

Results in the 2026–27 season
Date	Event	SP		FS		Total	
Date	Event	P	Score	P	Score	P	Score
Sep 24–27, 2026	(Slovakia) 2026 CS Nepela Memorial	5	80.59	8	139.46	7	220.05
Oct 15-18, 2026	(Hungary) 2026 CS Budapest Trophy	21	59.59	9	135.48	11	195.07
Oct 22–25, 2026	(Croatia) 2026 Golden Bear of Zagreb	1	72.31	2	118.98	2	191.29
Nov 6–8, 2026	2026 Cup of China	6	88.21	7	164.18	6	252.39
Nov 16–22, 2026	(Estonia) 2026 CS Tallinn Trophy	3	74.35	6	129.14	4	203.49

=== Single skating (for Russia) ===
==== Senior level ====
Results in the 2016–17 season
Date	Event	SP		FS		Total	
Date	Event	P	Score	P	Score	P	Score
Dec 20–25, 2016	(Russia) 2017 Russian Championships	17	46.97	17	113.45	17	160.42

Results in the 2017–18 season
Date	Event	SP		FS		Total	
Date	Event	P	Score	P	Score	P	Score
Dec 19–24, 2017	(Russia) 2018 Russian Championships	6	85.10	6	146.10	6	231.20

Results in the 2018–19 season
Date	Event	SP		FS		Total	
Date	Event	P	Score	P	Score	P	Score
Dec 21–24, 2018	(Russia) 2019 Russian Championships	15	60.30	8	145.60	11	205.90

Results in the 2019–20 season
Date	Event	SP		FS		Total	
Date	Event	P	Score	P	Score	P	Score
Dec 24–28, 2019	(Russia) 2020 Russian Championships	17	61.43	6	159.30	15	220.73

==== Junior level ====
Results in the 2012–13 season
Date	Event	SP		FS		Total	
Date	Event	P	Score	P	Score	P	Score
Dec 24–28, 2012	(Russia) 2013 Russian Championships (Junior)	15	58.52	14	113.94	16	172.46

Results in the 2013–14 season
Date	Event	SP		FS		Total	
Date	Event	P	Score	P	Score	P	Score
Dec 22–27, 2013	(Russia) 2014 Russian Championships (Junior)	12	59.64	7	128.32	7	187.96

Results in the 2014–15 season
Date	Event	SP		FS		Total	
Date	Event	P	Score	P	Score	P	Score
Sep 24–27, 2014	2014 JGP Estonia	16	44.40	4	126.28	6	170.68
Feb 4–7, 2015	(Russia) 2015 Russian Championships (Junior)	5	66.03	4	131.88	4	197.91

Results in the 2015–16 season
Date	Event	SP		FS		Total	
Date	Event	P	Score	P	Score	P	Score
Sep 30 – Oct 4, 2015	2015 JGP Spain	4	61.63	6	111.28	6	172.91
Jan 19–23, 2016	(Russia) 2016 Russian Championships (Junior)	18	51.39	18	97.67	18	149.06

Results in the 2017–18 season
Date	Event	SP		FS		Total	
Date	Event	P	Score	P	Score	P	Score
Oct 11–14, 2017	2017 JGP Italy	1	77.65	3	134.09	2	211.74
Oct 26–29, 2017	(Belarus) 2017 Minsk-Arena Ice Star	1	76.46	1	154.07	1	230.53
Jan 23–26, 2018	(Russia) 2018 Russian Championships (Junior)	11	70.36	4	144.40	7	214.76
