= 2023 CS Budapest Trophy =

- Type: ISU Challenger Series
- Date: October 13 – 15
- Season: 2023–24
- Location: Budapest, Hungary
- Host: Hungarian National Skating Federation
- Venue: Vasas Jégcentrum

Champions
- Men's singles: (Italy) Nikolaj Memola
- Women's singles: (United States) Bradie Tennell
- Ice dance: (Georgia (country)) Diana Davis / Gleb Smolkin
- Previous: 2022 CS Budapest Trophy
- Next: 2024 CS Budapest Trophy
- Previous CS: 2023 CS Finlandia Trophy
- Next CS: 2023 CS Denis Ten Memorial

The 2023 CS Budapest Trophy was held on October 13–15, 2023, in Budapest, Hungary. It was part of the 2023–24 ISU Challenger Series. Medals were awarded in men's singles, women's singles, and ice dance.

== Entries ==
The International Skating Union published the list of entries on September 22, 2023.

Country	Men	Women	Ice dance
Austria	—N/a	Olga Mikutina	—N/a
Austria	—N/a	Stefanie Pesendorfer	—N/a
Bulgaria	Filip Kaymakchiev	—N/a	
Canada	—N/a		Emmy Bronsard / Jacob Richmond
Canada	—N/a		Marie-Jade Lauriault / Romain Le Gac
China	—N/a		Shi Shang / Wu Nan
Czech Republic	—N/a	Barbora Vrankova	—N/a
Estonia	Aleksandr Selevko	Nataly Langerbaur	—N/a
Estonia	Mihhail Selevko	Olesja Leonova	—N/a
Finland	—N/a	Olivia Lisko	—N/a
Finland	—N/a	Minja Peltonen	—N/a
France	Luc Economides	Maïa Mazzara	Loïcia Demougeot / Théo le Mercier
France	Ian Vauclin	Lorine Schild	Natacha Lagouge / Arnaud Caffa
France	Xavier Vauclin	Léa Serna	—N/a
Georgia	—N/a	Alina Urushadze	Diana Davis / Gleb Smolkin
Germany	Kai Jagoda	Kristina Isaev	Jennifer Janse van Rensburg / Benjamin Steffan
Hong Kong	Kwun Hung Leung	Hiu Yau Chow	—N/a
Hungary	Aleksandr Vlasenko	Regina Schermann	Emese Csiszer / Mark Shapiro
Hungary	—N/a	Daria Zsirnov	Lucy Hancock / Ilias Fourati
Hungary	—N/a	—N/a	Mariia Ignateva / Danijil Szemko
Israel	—N/a		Shira Ichilov / Dmytriy Kravchenko
Israel	—N/a		Mariia Nosovitskaya / Mikhail Nosovitskiy
Italy	Gabriele Frangipani	—N/a	Giorgia Galimberti / Matteo Libasse Mandelli
Italy	Nikolaj Memola	—N/a	—N/a
Kazakhstan	Rakhat Bralin	Sofiya Farafonova	—N/a
Kazakhstan	Dias Jirenbayev	Anna Levkovets	—N/a
Latvia	Fedir Kulish	Anastasija Konga	—N/a
Latvia	—N/a	Sofja Stepčenko	—N/a
Moldova	—N/a	Anastasia Gracheva	—N/a
Netherlands	—N/a	Lindsay van Zundert	—N/a
Philippines	Edrian Paul Celestino	—N/a	
Poland	Vladimir Samoilov	—N/a	Anastasia Polibina / Pavel Golovishnikov
Spain	Euken Alberdi	—N/a	Sofía Val / Asaf Kazimov
Spain	Pablo Garcia	—N/a	—N/a
Spain	Tomàs-Llorenç Guarino Sabaté	—N/a	—N/a
Sweden	Jonathan Egyptson	Julia Brovall	Milla Ruud Reitan / Nikolaj Majorov
Sweden	Gabriel Folkesson	—N/a	
Sweden	Casper Johansson	—N/a	
Switzerland	Lukas Britschgi	Sara Franzi	—N/a
Switzerland	—N/a	Livia Kaiser	—N/a
Ukraine	—N/a	Yelizaveta Babenko	—N/a
United States	Tomoki Hiwatashi	Clare Seo	Katarina Wolfkostin / Dimitry Tsarevski
United States	—N/a	Bradie Tennell	—N/a

== Changes to preliminary assignments ==
Date	Discipline	Withdrew	Added	Ref.
September 25	Men	(South Korea) Lee Si-hyeong	—N/a	
September 25	Men	(Italy) Daniel Grassl	(Italy) Raffaele Francesco Zich	
September 27	Women	(Finland) Linnea Ceder	(Serbia) Antonina Dubinina	
September 27	Ice dance	—N/a	(Israel) Shira Ichilov / Dmytriy Kravchenko	
October 5	Ice dance	(United States) Isabella Flores / Ivan Desyatov	—N/a	
October 6	Men	(United Kingdom) Edward Appleby	—N/a	
October 6	Men	(Italy) Raffaele Francesco Zich	—N/a	
October 6	Men	(Slovakia) Adam Hagara	—N/a	
October 6	Women	(Hungary) Júlia Láng	—N/a	
October 6	Women	(Slovakia) Ema Doboszová	—N/a	
October 9	Women	(Ukraine) Anastasia Gozhva	—N/a	
October 12	Women	(Israel) Ella Chen	—N/a	
October 12	Women	(Israel) Elizabet Gervits	—N/a	
October 12	Women	(Estonia) Gerli Liinamäe	—N/a	
October 12	Women	(Serbia) Antonina Dubinina	—N/a	

== Results ==
=== Men's singles ===
Rank	Skater	Nation	Total points	SP		FS	
1st place, gold medalist(s)	Nikolaj Memola	Italy	250.37	1	88.99	2	161.38
2nd place, silver medalist(s)	Lukas Britschgi	Switzerland	246.12	4	77.78	1	168.34
3rd place, bronze medalist(s)	Tomoki Hiwatashi	United States	223.79	7	69.16	3	154.63
4	Mihhail Selevko	Estonia	219.18	2	82.11	9	137.07
5	Aleksandr Selevko	Estonia	217.85	3	79.93	7	137.92
6	Vladimir Samoilov	Poland	216.60	5	75.67	4	140.93
7	Luc Economides	France	212.91	6	73.13	6	139.78
8	Tomàs-Llorenç Guarino Sabaté	Spain	205.41	8	67.93	8	137.48
9	Kai Jagoda	Germany	204.62	10	64.09	5	140.53
10	Gabriele Frangipani	Italy	187.55	11	63.95	11	123.60
11	Edrian Paul Celestino	Philippines	184.07	9	65.21	15	118.86
12	Dias Jirenbayev	Kazakhstan	182.64	18	54.67	10	127.97
13	Aleksandr Vlasenko	Hungary	179.28	15	57.91	13	121.37
14	Fedir Kulish	Latvia	176.57	14	58.23	16	118.34
15	Xavier Vauclin	France	176.04	19	54.10	12	121.94
16	Gabriel Folkesson	Sweden	175.22	13	62.08	17	113.14
17	Casper Johansson	Sweden	172.02	20	52.43	14	119.59
18	Jonathan Egyptson	Sweden	161.66	12	62.46	20	99.20
19	Pablo Garcia	Spain	159.43	17	56.06	18	103.37
20	Kyrylo Lishenko	Ukraine	154.99	16	56.47	21	98.52
21	Rakhat Bralin	Kazakhstan	152.19	21	50.53	19	101.66
22	Euken Alberdi	Spain	143.84	22	46.18	22	97.66
23	Filip Kaymakchiev	Bulgaria	128.56	24	40.43	23	88.13
24	Kwun Hung Leung	Hong Kong	107.92	23	43.12	24	64.80

=== Women's singles ===
Rank	Skater	Nation	Total points	SP		FS	
1st place, gold medalist(s)	Bradie Tennell	United States	185.84	1	65.09	1	120.75
2nd place, silver medalist(s)	Léa Serna	France	178.56	4	62.58	2	115.98
3rd place, bronze medalist(s)	Clare Seo	United States	171.94	2	63.35	4	108.59
4	Livia Kaiser	Switzerland	170.39	3	62.77	6	107.62
5	Olga Mikutina	Austria	169.49	6	61.48	5	108.01
6	Nataly Langerbaur	Estonia	165.85	10	54.84	3	111.01
7	Lorine Schild	France	164.15	5	61.63	9	102.52
8	Sara Franzi	Switzerland	158.67	8	55.56	8	103.11
9	Anastasija Konga	Latvia	157.37	13	51.66	7	105.71
10	Alina Urushadze	Georgia	153.37	15	50.88	10	102.49
11	Sofja Stepčenko	Latvia	148.19	7	56.81	18	91.38
12	Minja Peltonen	Finland	147.32	9	55.27	17	92.05
13	Anastasia Gracheva	Moldova	146.62	12	51.83	13	94.79
14	Yelizaveta Babenko	Ukraine	145.82	19	48.76	11	97.06
15	Barbora Vránková	Czech Republic	143.95	16	50.75	15	93.20
16	Olesja Leonova	Estonia	142.63	11	54.70	21	87.93
17	Olivia Lisko	Finland	141.19	17	50.34	19	90.85
18	Kristina Isaev	Germany	139.67	20	46.86	16	92.81
19	Maïa Mazzara	France	137.53	25	42.31	12	95.22
20	Lindsay van Zundert	Netherlands	135.24	26	40.92	14	94.32
21	Julia Brovall	Sweden	135.16	18	48.89	22	86.27
22	Regina Schermann	Hungary	132.18	22	43.95	20	88.23
23	Anna Levkovets	Kazakhstan	131.38	21	45.35	23	86.03
24	Dária Zsirnov	Hungary	122.99	24	42.90	24	80.09
25	Sofiya Farafonova	Kazakhstan	120.89	23	43.67	25	77.22
26	Hiu Yau Chow	Hong Kong	101.67	27	31.09	26	70.58
WD	Stefanie Pesendorfer	Austria	withdrew	14	50.88	withdrew from competition	

=== Ice dance ===
Rank	Team	Nation	Total points	RD		FD	
1st place, gold medalist(s)	Diana Davis / Gleb Smolkin	Georgia	191.84	1	75.21	1	116.83
2nd place, silver medalist(s)	Marie-Jade Lauriault / Romain le Gac	Canada	188.32	2	71.92	2	116.40
3rd place, bronze medalist(s)	Loïcia Demougeot / Théo le Mercier	France	179.68	3	69.37	3	110.31
4	Jennifer Janse van Rensburg / Benjamin Steffan	Germany	176.42	4	68.95	4	107.47
5	Katarina Wolfkostin / Dimitry Tsarevski	United States	172.88	5	68.92	5	103.96
6	Sofía Val / Asaf Kazimov	Spain	168.34	6	65.51	6	102.83
7	Natacha Lagouge / Arnaud Caffa	France	164.14	7	63.95	7	100.19
8	Milla Ruud Reitan / Nikolaj Majorov	Sweden	154.79	10	60.69	9	94.10
9	Mariia Ignateva / Danijil Szemko	Hungary	152.96	11	57.45	8	95.51
10	Mariia Nosovitskaya / Mikhail Nosovitskiy	Israel	152.74	8	62.43	10	90.31
11	Emmy Bronsard / Jacob Richmond	Canada	150.51	9	60.77	11	89.74
12	Shi Shang / Wu Nan	China	144.56	12	56.14	12	88.42
13	Lucy Hancock / Ilias Fourati	Hungary	137.27	14	53.04	13	84.23
14	Shira Ichilov / Dmytriy Kravchenko	Israel	135.65	13	55.70	15	79.95
15	Emese Csiszer / Mark Shapiro	Hungary	132.36	16	51.70	14	80.66
16	Anastasia Polibina / Pavel Golovishnikov	Poland	128.85	15	52.80	17	76.05
17	Giorgia Galimberti / Matteo Libasse Mandelli	Italy	127.36	17	50.71	16	76.65
