= Lorine Schild =

French figure skater (born 2005)

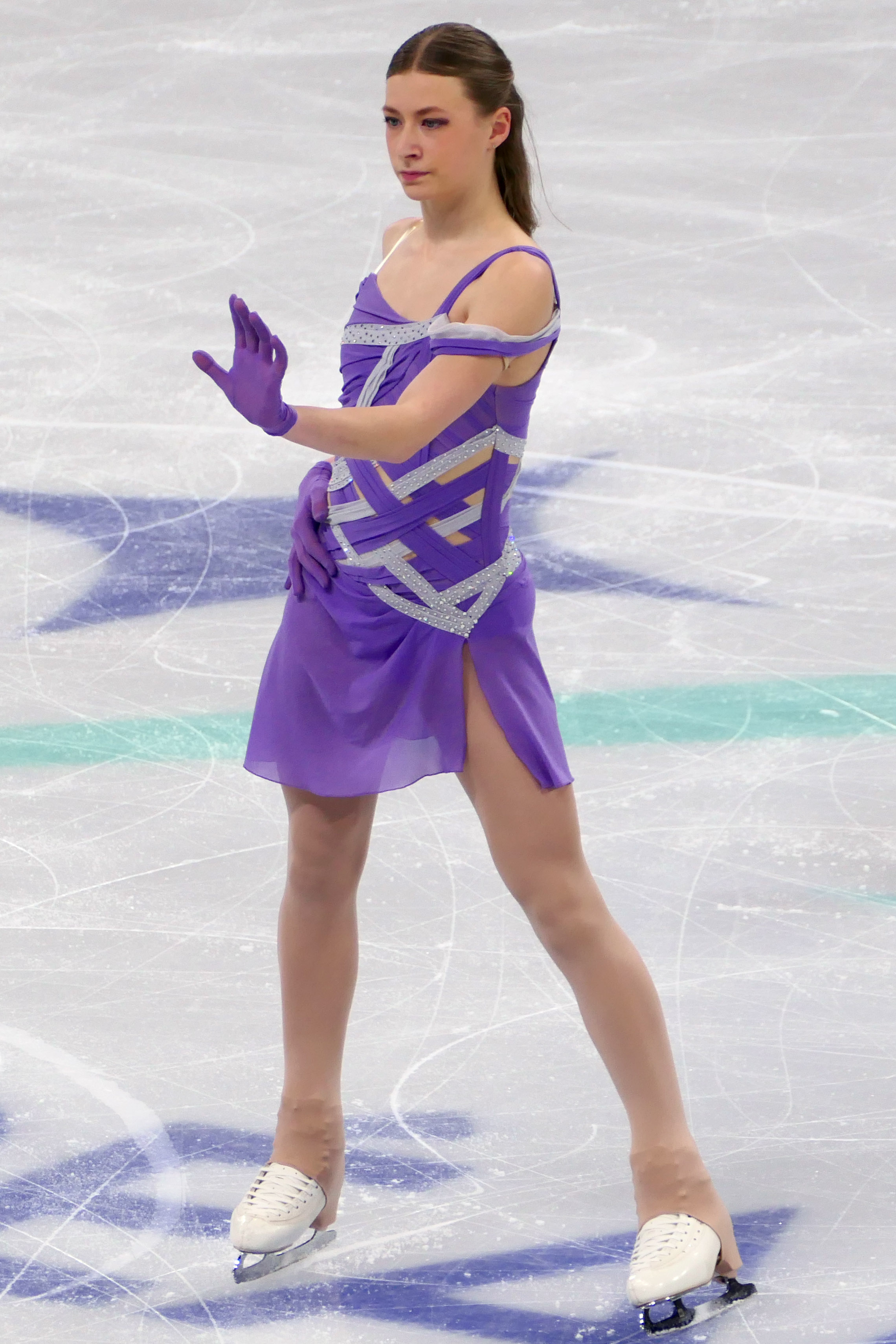
- Schild at the 2024 World Championships

Personal information
- Born: 6 January 2005 (age 21) Reims, France
- Home town: Tinqueux, France
- Height: 1.73 m (5 ft 8 in)

Figure skating career
- Country: France
- Discipline: Women's singles
- Coach: Malika Tahir
- Skating club: Reims Figure Skating Club
- Began skating: 2009

Medal record
French Championships
Gold medal – first place	2024 Vaujany	Singles
Silver medal – second place	2022 Cergy-Pontoise	Singles
Silver medal – second place	2023 Rouen	Singles

Lorine Schild (born 6 January 2005) is a French figure skater. She is the 2024 CS Budapest Trophy bronze medalist and the 2024 French national champion.

On the junior level, she is the 2022 European Youth Olympic Festival champion and 2023 French junior national champion.

Schild represented France at the 2026 Winter Olympics.

== Personal life ==
Schild was born on 6 January 2005 in Reims, France. She has an older sister, Maëlle, who previously also competed in figure skating. As of 2022, Schild is a high school student.

== Career ==
=== Early career ===
Schild began figure skating in 2009.

She won her first national medal, a bronze, at the 2019 French Junior Championships.

=== 2019–20 season: Junior Grand Prix debut ===
Schild made her Junior Grand Prix debut at the 2019 JGP France, where she finished seventeenth. She would then go on to place fourth at the 2019 Master's de Patinage.

Debuting at the 2020 French Championships on the senior level, Schild would go on to finish fourth as well as win a second consecutive bronze medal at the 2020 French Junior Championships.

She closed the season with an eighth-place finish at the 2020 International Challenge Cup.

=== 2020–21 season ===
Schild began her season with a silver medal at the 2020 Master's de Patinage. She went on to finish fourth at the 2021 French Championships for the second year in a row.

She ended the season with a silver medal at the 2021 Tallink Hotels Cup.

=== 2021–22 season: Senior international debut ===
Schild started the season at the 2021 JGP Slovakia and the 2021 Master's de Patinage, where she placed twelfth and second, respectively. She would also go on to finish seventh at the 2022 CS Ice Challenge.

Competing at the 2022 French Championships, Schild won the silver medal at both the junior and senior championships.

Schild went on to compete at the 2022 Bavarian Open, winning the bronze medal, before going on to win silver and bronze at the 2022 Dragon Trophy and the 2022 Tallink Hotels Cup, respectively. She then won the gold medal at the 2022 European Youth Olympic Winter Festival, eleven points over silver medalist, Olivia Lisko of Finland.

She concluded the season with a sixteenth-place finish at the 2022 World Junior Championships in Tallinn, Estonia.

=== 2022–23 season: Junior National title ===
Schild began the season by finishing sixth at both the 2022 JGP Czech Republic and the 2022 JGP Slovakia. She then went on to win gold at the 2022 Master's de Patinage and place fourth at the 2022 CS Ice Challenge.

At the 2023 French Championships, Schild won gold at the junior championships and silver at the senior championships.

Schild went on to compete at the 2023 World Junior Championships in Calgary, Alberta, where she placed eleventh. In addition, Schild was selected to compete at the 2023 World Championships in Saitama, Japan, where she placed twenty-fifth in the short program, failing to qualify for the free skate segment of the competition.

Schild then joined Team France at the 2023 World Team Trophy, where she was tenth in the short program and tenth in the free skate. Team France finished fifth overall.

=== 2023–24 season: Senior National title ===
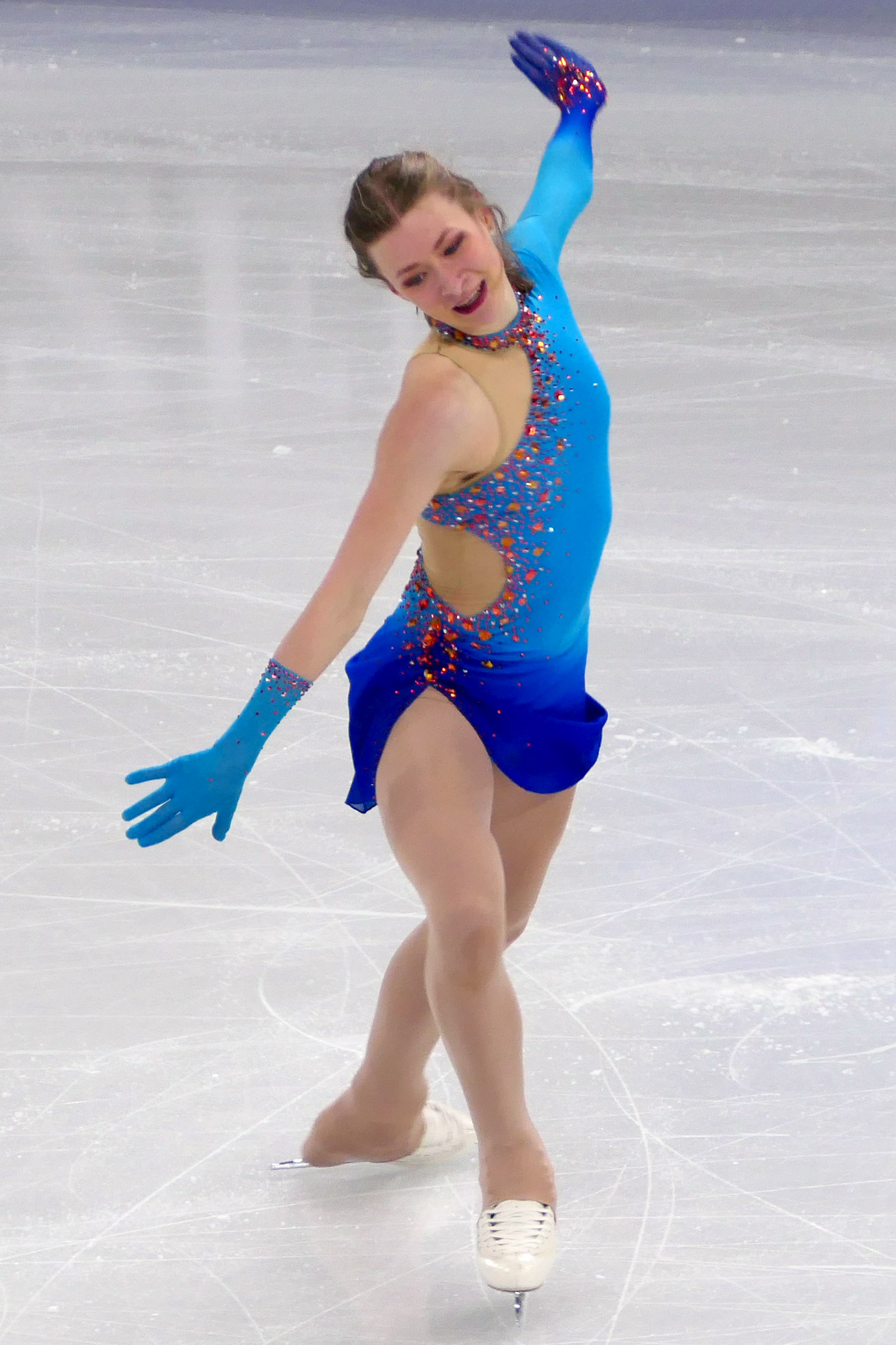
Schild performing her short program at the 2024 World Championships

Beginning the season with two assignments on the Challenger circuit, Schild placed eighth at the 2023 CS Nebelhorn Trophy and seventh at the 2023 CS Budapest Trophy. Between these events, Schild won the silver medal at the 2023 Master's de Patinage behind Léa Serna.

Invited to make her senior debut on the Grand Prix circuit, Schild competed on home ice at the 2023 Grand Prix de France. She set new personal bests in the free skate and total score to finish eighth, and said she was "so happy" with her performance and the "supportive" audience in Angers. She went on to place fifth at the 2023 Grand Prix of Espoo, and said she would "never have imagined these good results," having already been "so happy" to get two assignments.

Schild won the French senior national title for the first time at the championships in Vaujany. Consequently, she was named to make her European Championship debut as the lone French women's entry at the 2024 edition in Kaunas. Sixth in both segments of the competition, she finished fifth overall. Schild said she was "so happy" with the result, citing her pre-event goal of placing in the top ten. She went on to compete at the 2024 World Championships, coming seventeenth.

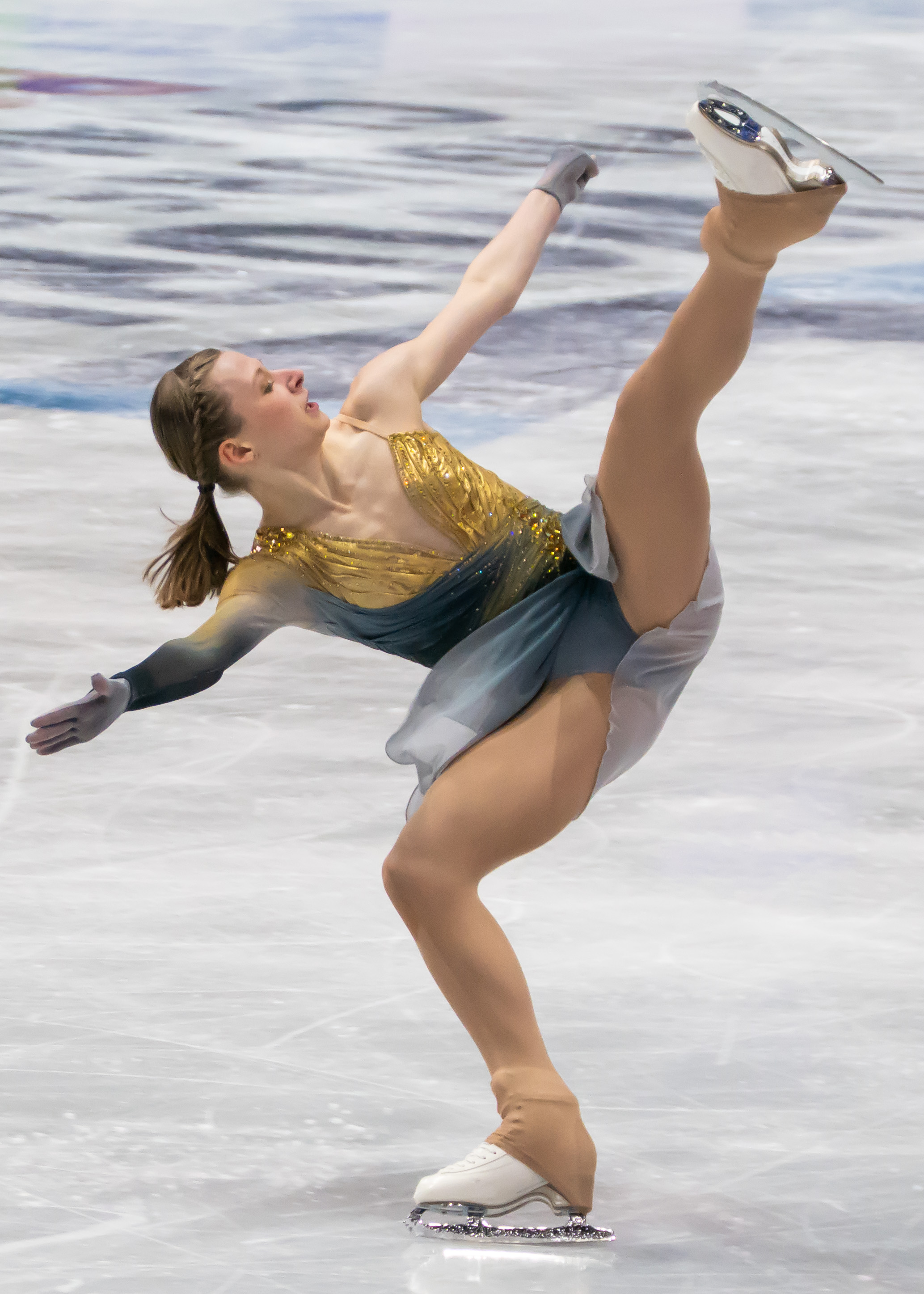
Schild performing a fan spiral during her free skate at the 2025 World Championships

=== 2024–25 season ===
Schild started the season by winning gold at the 2024 Master's de Patinage and bronze at the 2024 CS Budapest Trophy. Going on to compete on the 2024–25 Grand Prix circuit, Schild would finish tenth at the 2024 Grand Prix de France and sixth at the 2024 Finlandia Trophy. One week following the latter event, Schild placed fourth at the 2024 CS Warsaw Cup.

In mid-December, Schild announced her withdrawal from the 2024 French Championships due to an ankle injury. Despite this, Schild was selected to compete at the 2025 European Championships in late January, where she finished in tenth place.

Named to the 2025 World team, Schild placed fifteenth overall at those championships. A couple weeks later, she was selected to compete for Team France at the 2025 World Team Trophy, placing eighth in the women's singles event. Team France subsequently finished the event in fourth place overall.

=== 2025–26 season: Milano Cortina Olympics ===
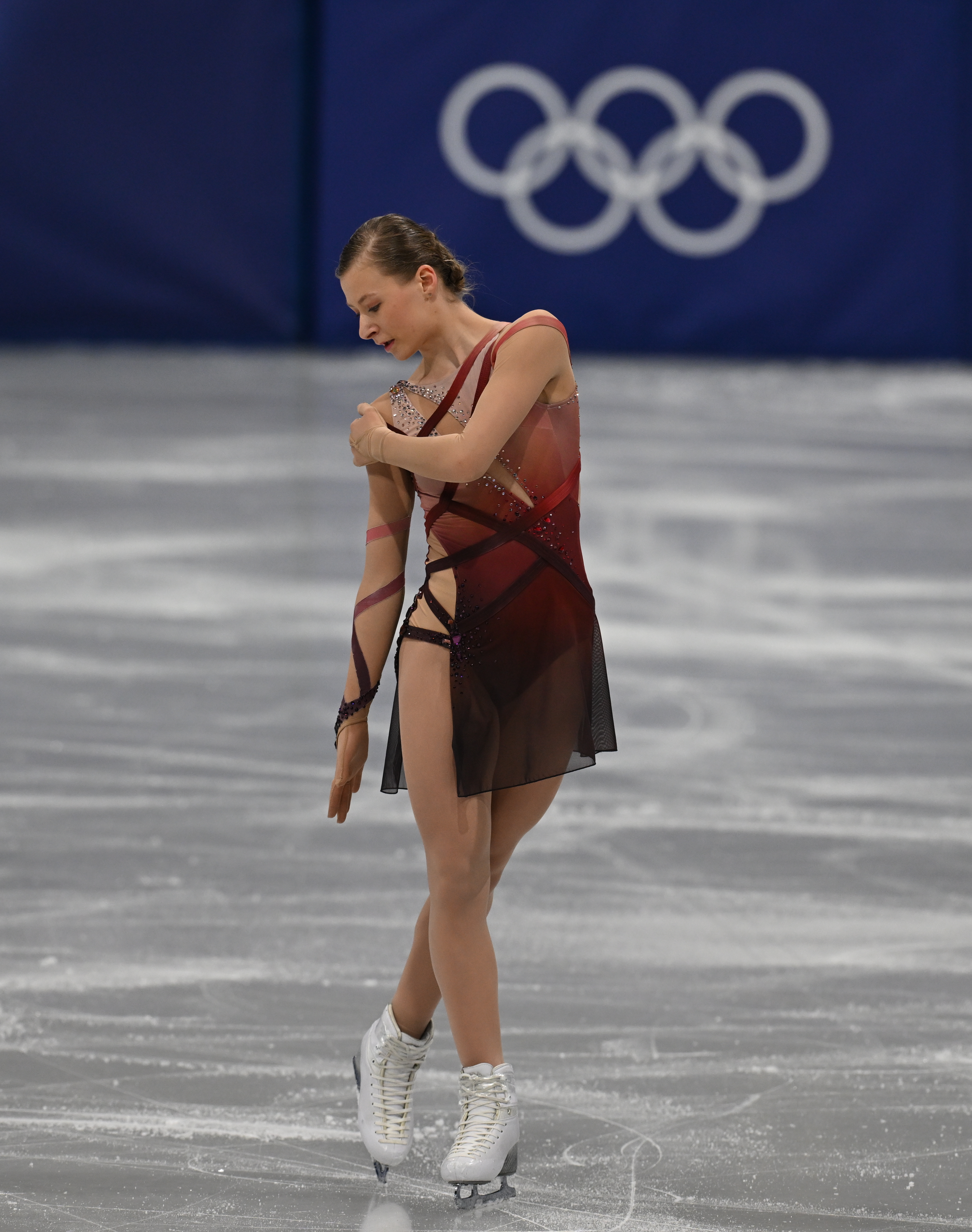
Schild at the 2026 Winter Olympics

Schild opened the season by winning gold at the 2025 Master's de Patinage and finishing sixth at the 2025 CS Nepela Memorial. She then competed on the 2025–26 Grand Prix series, she finished fifth at the 2025 Grand Prix de France and eighth at the 2025 Finlandia Trophy. Between the two events, Schild won gold at the 2025 Tirnavia Ice Cup.

In December, following a ninth-place finish at the 2025 CS Golden Spin of Zagreb, Schild competed at the 2026 French Championships, winning the silver medal behind Stefania Gladki. She was subsequently named to the 2026 Winter Olympic team. The following month, Schild finished eighteenth at the 2026 European Championships in Sheffield, England, United Kingdom.

On February 6, Schild placed seventh in the short program in the 2026 Winter Olympics Figure Skating Team Event. "It was very good," said Schild. "It was amazing to skate on the Olympic stage and to skate with the encouragement of the French team. It was during the end of the program, during the steps, it was very motivating and very fun." In the individual event, she finished in twenty-second place.

The following month, Schild competed at the 2026 World Championships – finishing in eighteenth place overall.

== Programs ==
Season	Short program	Free skating	Exhibition
2025–2026	Stairway to Heaven by Led Zeppelin performed by Beth Hart choreo. by Massimo Scali	Woman; Not Alone Anymore by Armand Amar; No More Fight Left In Me by Armand Amar & Imany choreo. by Massimo Scali	Laissez-moi danser by Ibrahim Maalouf & Izïa arranged by Maxime Rodriguez choreo. by Gabriella Papadakis
2024–2025	Laissez-moi danser by Ibrahim Maalouf & Izïa arranged by Maxime Rodriguez choreo. by Gabriella Papadakis	Quiet Moon by Colossal Trailer Music arranged by Cédric Tour; The Lion Woman by Uno Helmersson arranged by Cédric Tour; The Demand of Man (Succession Studios) by Greg Dombrowski; The Sun Queen by Rok Nardin & Greg Dombrowski arranged by Cédric Tour choreo. by Benoît Richaud	Diamonds Are Forever (Mantronik 007 Mix) (from Diamonds Are Forever) performed by Shirley Bassey
2023–2024	Ojos de Serpiente by DORA choreo. by Gabriella Papadakis	Hell to the Liars by London Grammar, My Riot, & Paul Epworth choreo. by Gabriella Papadakis	Nature Boy (Acoustic) performed by AURORA
2022–2023	In the End by Linkin Park performed by Tommee Profitt, feat. Fleurie and Jung Youth choreo. by Laurie May, Malika Tahir, Catherine Papadakis	Tango Yesica Lozano by Rascasuelos; El Tango de Roxanne (from Moulin Rouge!) performed by Ewan McGregor, José Feliciano, and Jacek Koman choreo. by Laurie May, Malika Tahir, Catherine Papadakis	
2021–2022	Everybody Wants to Rule the World (from The Hunger Games: Catching Fire) by Tears for Fears performed by Lorde choreo. by Laurie May	Le Jazz Hot! performed by Julie Andrews arranged by Maxime Rodriguez choreo. by Laurie May	
2020–2021			
2019–2020	Coward by Yael Naim choreo. by Laurie May	Arte y Compás; Ilusión (Alegrías) by Manolo Carrasco; Gitaneria by Alfredo Rodrigues choreo. by Barbara Piton	

== Competitive highlights ==
- GP – Event of the ISU Grand Prix Series
- JGP – Event of the ISU Junior Grand Prix Series
- CS – Event of the ISU Challenger Series
- TBD – Assigned
- WD – Withdrew from competition
- C – Event was cancelled
- Medals at team events are awarded for the team results only. Individual placements at team events are listed in parentheses.

Competition placements at senior level
Season	2019–20	2020–21	2021–22	2022–23	2023–24	2024–25	2025–26	2026-27
Winter Olympics							22nd	
Winter Olympics (Team Event)							6th	
World Championships				25th	17th	15th	18th	
European Championships					5th	10th	18th	
French Championships	4th	4th	2nd	2nd	1st		2nd	
World Team Trophy				5th (9th)		4th (8th)		
GP Finland					5th	6th	8th	
GP France					8th	10th	5th	
CS Budapest Trophy					7th	3rd		
CS Golden Spin of Zagreb							9th	
CS Ice Challenge				4th				
CS Nebelhorn Trophy					8th			
CS Nepela Memorial							6th	
CS Warsaw Cup						4th		
Challenge Cup					3rd			
Master's de Patinage				1st	2nd	1st	1st	
Tallink Hotels Cup			3rd					
Tirnavia Ice Cup							1st	

Competition placements at junior level
Season	2018–19	2019–20	2020–21	2021–22	2022–23
World Junior Championships				16th	11th
French Championships	3rd	3rd	C	2nd	1st
JGP Czech Republic					6th
JGP France		17th			
JGP Poland					6th
JGP Slovakia				12th	
Bavarian Open				3rd	
Challenge Cup		8th			
Dragon Trophy	2nd			2nd	
European Youth Olympic Festival				1st	
Ice Challenge				7th	
Master's de Patinage	6th	4th	2nd	1st	1st
Tallink Hotels Cup			2nd		

== Detailed results ==
ISU personal best scores in the +5/-5 GOE System
Segment	Type	Score	Event
Total	TSS	189.31	2025 Grand Prix de France
Short program	TSS	63.66	2025 World Team Trophy
Short program	TES	35.62	2024 CS Budapest Trophy
Short program	PCS	28.52	2025 Finlandia Trophy
Free skating	TSS	126.86	2025 Grand Prix de France
Free skating	TES	69.08	2025 Grand Prix de France
Free skating	PCS	58.44	2024 European Championships

=== Senior level ===
- Medals at team events are awarded for the team results only. Individual placements at team events are listed in parentheses.

Results in the 2019-20 season
Date	Event	SP		FS		Total	
Date	Event	P	Score	P	Score	P	Score
Dec 19–21, 2019	(France) 2020 French Championships	4	52.38	4	93.22	3	145.60

Results in the 2020-21 season
Date	Event	SP		FS		Total	
Date	Event	P	Score	P	Score	P	Score
Feb 5–6, 2021	(France) 2021 French Championships	3	57.11	4	93.82	4	150.93

Results in the 2021-22 season
Date	Event	SP		FS		Total	
Date	Event	P	Score	P	Score	P	Score
Dec 16–18, 2021	(France) 2022 French Championships	3	43.22	6	77.46	6	120.69
Mar 3-4, 2022	(Estonia) 2022 Tallink Hotels Cup	6	50.24	2	106.40	3	156.64

Results in the 2022-23 season
Date	Event	SP		FS		Total	
Date	Event	P	Score	P	Score	P	Score
Oct 6–8, 2022	(France) 2022 Master's de Patinage	3	59.40	1	122.80	1	182.20
Nov 9–13, 2022	(Austria) 2022 CS Ice Challenge	5	57.05	5	111.25	4	168.30
Dec 15–17, 2022	(France) 2023 French Championships	2	61.47	2	114.98	2	176.45
Mar 22–26, 2023	(Japan) 2023 World Championships	25	54.35	—N/a	—N/a	25	54.35
Apr 13–16, 2023	(Japan) 2023 World Team Trophy	10	55.72	10	114.28	5 (9)	170.00

Results in the 2023-24 season
Date	Event	SP		FS		Total	
Date	Event	P	Score	P	Score	P	Score
Sep 20–23, 2023	(Germany) 2023 CS Nebelhorn Trophy	12	46.62	6	109.03	8	155.65
Sep 28–30, 2023	(France) 2023 Master's de Patinage	2	54.31	1	119.18	2	173.49
Oct 13-15, 2023	(Hungary) 2023 CS Budapest Trophy	5	61.63	9	102.52	7	164.15
Nov 3–5, 2023	2023 Grand Prix de France	7	58.80	8	120.31	8	179.11
Nov 17-19, 2023	(Estonia) 2023 Grand Prix of Espoo	5	61.07	6	114.64	5	175.71
Dec 13–14, 2023	(France) 2024 French Championships	1	66.50	1	133.50	1	200.00
Jan 8–14, 2024	(Lithuania) 2024 European Championships	6	63.27	6	120.59	5	183.86
Nov 17-19, 2023	(Netherlands) 2024 Challenge Cup	3	59.78	3	116.90	3	176.68
Mar 18–24, 2024	(Canada) 2024 World Championships	18	59.41	15	113.49	17	172.90

Results in the 2024-25 season
Date	Event	SP		FS		Total	
Date	Event	P	Score	P	Score	P	Score
Sep 26-28, 2024	(France) 2024 Master's de Patinage	1	63.30	1	108.60	1	171.90
Oct 11–13, 2024	(Hungary) 2024 CS Budapest Trophy	5	63.48	3	116.22	3	179.70
Nov 1–3, 2024	2024 Grand Prix de France	10	56.51	10	107.81	10	164.32
Nov 15–17, 2024	(Finland) 2024 Finlandia Trophy	7	59.22	7	123.14	6	182.36
Nov 20-24, 2024	(Poland) 2024 CS Warsaw Cup	2	58.02	6	109.73	4	167.75
Jan 28 – Feb 2, 2025	(Estonia) 2025 European Championships	7	62.47	13	105.74	10	168.21
Mar 25–30, 2025	(United States) 2025 World Championships	15	60.59	14	117.31	15	177.90
Apr 17–20, 2025	(Japan) 2025 World Team Trophy	8	63.66	8	117.78	4 (8)	181.44

Results in the 2025–26 season
Date	Event	SP		FS		Total	
Date	Event	P	Score	P	Score	P	Score
Aug 28–30, 2025	(France) 2025 Master's de Patinage	2	56.79	1	120.23	1	177.02
Sep 25–27, 2025	(Slovakia) 2025 CS Nepela Memorial	6	59.01	5	116.47	5	175.48
Oct 17–19, 2025	2025 Grand Prix de France	5	62.45	5	126.86	5	189.31
Oct 31 – Nov 2, 2025	(Slovakia) 2025 Tirnavia Ice Cup	1	65.14	1	116.44	1	181.58
Nov 21–23, 2025	(Finland) 2025 Finlandia Trophy	8	60.74	8	114.89	8	175.63
Dec 3–6, 2025	(Croatia) 2025 CS Golden Spin of Zagreb	9	55.97	8	106.99	9	162.96
Dec 18–20, 2025	(France) 2026 French Championships	1	65.45	2	128.88	2	194.33
Jan 13–18, 2026	(United Kingdom) 2026 European Championships	13	56.14	18	97.15	18	153.29
Feb 6–8, 2026	(Italy) 2026 Winter Olympics – Team event	7	62.24	—N/a	—N/a	6	—N/a
Feb 17–19, 2026	(Italy) 2026 Winter Olympics	24	55.63	22	111.45	22	167.08
Mar 24–29, 2026	(Czech Republic) 2026 World Championships	17	59.14	20	106.09	18	165.23

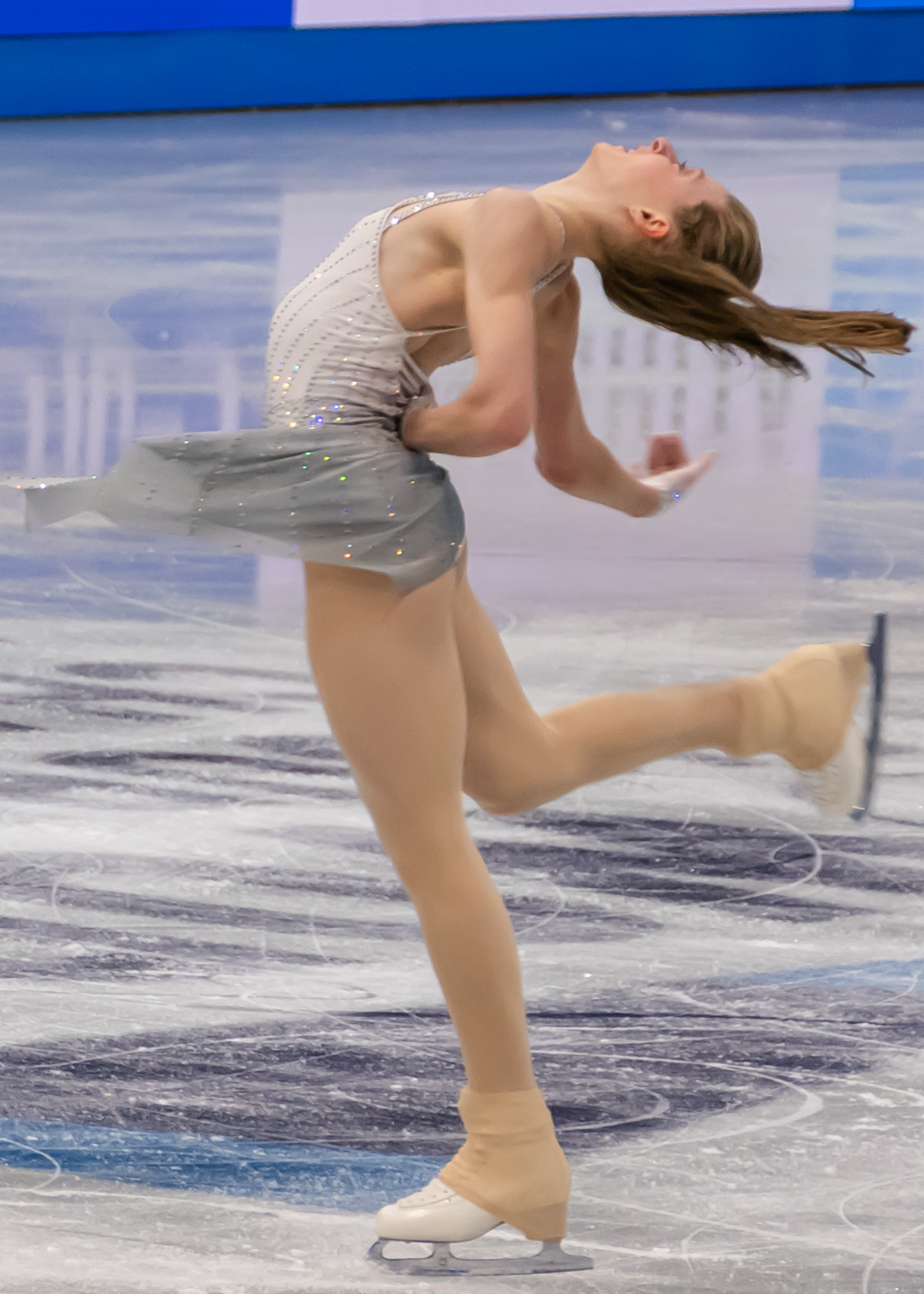
Schild performing a layback spin during the short program at the 2025 World Championships

=== Junior level ===
2022–23 season
Date	Event	SP	FS	Total
Feb. 27 – Mar. 5, 2023	2023 World Junior Championships	7; 61.04	13; 107.31	11; 168.35
February 3–5, 2023	2023 French Junior Championships	1; 60.37	1; 125.78	1; 186.15
October 6–8, 2022	2022 Master's de Patinage	3; 59.40	1; 122.80	1; 182.20
Sept. 28 – Oct. 1, 2022	2022 JGP Poland I	5; 60.15	5; 118.85	6; 179.00
Aug. 31 – Sept. 3, 2022	2022 JGP Czech Republic	4; 58.07	6; 107.75	6; 165.82
2021–22 season
Date	Event	SP	FS	Total
April 13–17, 2022	2022 World Junior Championships	17; 54.58	14; 99.99	16; 154.57
March 20–25, 2022	2022 European Youth Olympic Winter Festival	2; 57.88	1; 109.10	1; 166.98
February 11–13, 2022	2022 Dragon Trophy	3; 50.49	2; 99.16	2; 149.65
January 18–23, 2022	2022 Bavarian Open	3; 48.50	3; 106.27	3; 154.77
November 10–14, 2021	2021 Ice Challenge	3; 48.46	8; 80.75	7; 129.21
Sept. 30 – Oct. 2, 2021	2021 Master's de Patinage	2; 55.57	1; 105.64	1; 161.21
September 1–4, 2021	2021 JGP Slovakia	13; 45.64	13; 86.21	12; 131.85
2020–21 season
Date	Event	SP	FS	Total
February 18–21, 2021	2021 Tallink Hotels Cup	2; 52.26	2; 92.38	2; 144.64
Sept. 30 – Oct. 2, 2020	2020 Master's de Patinage	2; 55.57	1; 105.64	1; 161.21
2019–20 season
Date	Event	SP	FS	Total
February 20–23, 2020	2020 International Challenge Cup	8; 50.82	8; 89.69	8; 140.51
February 7–9, 2020	2020 French Junior Championships	3; 52.46	3; 85.33	3; 137.79
September 26–28, 2019	2018 Master's de Patinage	2; 49.13	5; 72.17	4; 121.30
August 21–24, 2019	2019 JGP France	19; 44.88	16; 87.58	17; 132.46
2018–19 season
Date	Event	SP	FS	Total
February 22–24, 2019	2019 French Junior Championships	3; 47.21	4; 87.58	3; 134.79
September 25–27, 2018	2018 Master's de Patinage	3; 43.23	6; 77.46	6; 120.69
