= 2022 CS Budapest Trophy =

- Type: ISU Challenger Series
- Date: October 13 – 16
- Season: 2022–23
- Location: Budapest, Hungary
- Host: Hungarian National Skating Federation
- Venue: Vasas Jégcentrum

Champions
- Men's singles: (Italy) Matteo Rizzo
- Women's singles: (United States) Ava Marie Ziegler
- Ice dance: (Canada) Marjorie Lajoie / Zachary Lagha
- Previous: 2020 CS Budapest Trophy
- Next: 2023 CS Budapest Trophy
- Previous CS: 2022 CS Finlandia Trophy
- Next CS: 2022 CS Denis Ten Memorial Challenge

The 2022 CS Budapest Trophy was held on October 13–16, 2022, in Budapest, Hungary. It was the sixth event of the 2022–23 ISU Challenger Series. Medals were awarded in men's singles, women's singles, and ice dance.

== Entries ==
The International Skating Union published the list of entries on September 23, 2022.

Country	Men	Women	Ice dance
Australia			India Nette / Eron Westwood
Canada			Alicia Fabbri / Paul Ayer; Marjorie Lajoie / Zachary Lagha
Croatia		Hana Cvijanović; Dora Hus	
Czech Republic		Barbora Vránková	Denisa Cimlová / Joti Polizoakis
Denmark		Maia Sørensen	
Ecuador		Katherine Ona	
Estonia	Aleksandr Selevko	Nataly Langerbaur; Niina Petrõkina; Kristina Škuleta-Gromova	
France			Evgeniia Lopareva / Geoffrey Brissaud; Lou Terreaux / Noé Perron
Germany	Kai Jagoda	Nicole Schott	Lara Luft / Maximilian Pfisterer; Charise Matthaei / Max Liebers
Great Britain	Graham Newberry		
Hungary	Mózes József Berei; Aleksandr Vlasenko	Júlia Láng; Regina Schermann; Daria Zsirnov	Lucy Hancock / Ilias Fourati; Mariia Ignateva / Danijil Szemko
Israel			Mariia Nosovitskaya / Mikhail Nosovitskiy
Italy	Gabriele Frangipani; Nikolaj Memola; Matteo Rizzo		Carolina Portesi Peroni / Michael Chrastecky
Moldova		Anastasia Gracheva	
Norway		Frida Turiddotter Berge	
Poland	Vladimir Samoilov		Anastasia Polibina / Pavel Golovishnikov
Serbia		Antonina Dubinina	
Slovakia		Ema Doboszová	
Slovenia		Daša Grm	
South Korea		Ji Seo-yeon; Lee Si-won	
Spain	Tomàs-Llorenç Guarino Sabaté; Iker Oyarzabal Albas		
Sweden	Gabriel Folkesson; Oliver Praetorius		
Switzerland	Noah Bodenstein; Lukas Britschgi; Nurullah Sahaka	Alexia Paganini; Kimmy Repond	
Ukraine	Mykhailo Rudkovskyi		
United States	Maxim Naumov; Maxim Zharkov	Gabriella Izzo; Ava Marie Ziegler	Oona Brown / Gage Brown; Katarina Wolfkostin / Jeffrey Chen

=== Changes to preliminary assignments ===
Date	Discipline	Withdrew	Added	Notes	Ref.
September 28	Women	(South Korea) You Young	(Germany) Nicole Schott		
September 28	Women	(Norway) Linnea Kilsand	—		
September 28	Ice dance	(Netherlands) Chelsea Verhaegh / Sherim van Geffen	—		
October 6	Men	(Czech Republic) Matyáš Bĕlohradský	(Spain) Tomàs-Llorenç Guarino Sabaté		
October 6	Men	(Israel) Mark Gorodnitsky	—		
October 6	Women	(Finland) Emmi Peltonen	—		
October 6	Women	(Hungary) Lili Krizsanovszki	—		
October 10	Women	(Germany) Kristina Isaev	—		
October 11	Men	(Finland) Valtter Virtanen	—		
October 11	Men	(Israel) Nikita Kovalenko	—		
October 11	Men	(Sweden) Oliver Praetorius	—		
October 11	Women	(Italy) Alessia Tornaghi	—	Injury	
October 11	Women	(Slovakia) Alexandra Michaela Filcová	—		
October 13	Men	(France) Kévin Aymoz	—		
October 13	Ice dance	(Italy) Charlène Guignard / Marco Fabbri	—	Illness	

== Results ==
=== Men's singles ===
Rank	Skater	Nation	Total points	SP		FS	
1st place, gold medalist(s)	Matteo Rizzo	Italy	253.34	2	83.13	1	170.21
2nd place, silver medalist(s)	Lukas Britschgi	Switzerland	239.66	5	72.85	2	166.81
3rd place, bronze medalist(s)	Nikolaj Memola	Italy	231.47	3	78.78	4	152.69
4	Gabriele Frangipani	Italy	230.99	7	70.79	3	160.20
5	Maxim Naumov	United States	227.17	1	87.11	5	140.06
6	Tomàs-Llorenç Guarino Sabaté	Spain	205.89	4	74.58	7	131.31
7	Vladimir Samoilov	Poland	202.25	8	68.64	6	133.61
8	Aleksandr Selevko	Estonia	200.51	6	71.50	8	129.01
9	Maxim Zharkov	United States	192.23	10	65.03	9	127.20
10	Kai Jagoda	Germany	188.43	9	67.47	11	120.96
11	Graham Newberry	Great Britain	182.99	11	61.83	10	121.16
12	Aleksandr Vlasenko	Hungary	169.77	13	55.81	14	113.96
13	Noah Bodenstein	Switzerland	168.53	17	51.19	12	117.34
14	Gabriel Folkesson	Sweden	161.30	14	54.74	15	106.56
15	Nurullah Sahaka	Switzerland	159.94	18	45.75	13	114.19
16	Mózes József Berei	Hungary	152.95	15	53.73	17	99.22
17	Iker Oyarzabal Albas	Spain	152.42	12	55.81	18	96.61
18	Mykhailo Rudkovskyi	Ukraine	151.48	16	51.42	16	100.06

=== Women's singles ===
Rank	Skater	Nation	Total points	SP		FS	
1st place, gold medalist(s)	Ava Marie Ziegler	United States	185.83	4	55.59	1	130.24
2nd place, silver medalist(s)	Kimmy Repond	Switzerland	177.74	1	60.86	3	116.88
3rd place, bronze medalist(s)	Niina Petrõkina	Estonia	176.32	8	53.00	2	123.32
4	Júlia Láng	Hungary	165.07	2	58.65	5	106.42
5	Ema Doboszová	Slovakia	161.56	9	52.01	4	109.55
6	Anastasia Gracheva	Moldova	157.46	6	53.46	6	104.00
7	Kristina Škuleta-Gromova	Estonia	153.57	3	57.87	10	95.70
8	Gabriella Izzo	United States	153.23	10	52.01	7	101.22
9	Nataly Langerbaur	Estonia	147.99	7	53.07	11	94.92
10	Nicole Schott	Germany	147.46	11	51.45	8	96.01
11	Regina Schermann	Hungary	144.67	12	48.82	9	95.85
12	Daša Grm	Slovenia	135.27	14	47.76	12	87.51
13	Lee Si-won	South Korea	134.17	13	47.85	13	86.32
14	Frida Turiddotter Berge	Norway	123.38	16	43.35	14	80.03
15	Dora Hus	Croatia	120.09	18	40.99	15	79.10
16	Daria Zsirvov	Hungary	117.29	15	44.30	16	72.99
17	Hana Cvijanović	Croatia	115.57	17	43.27	17	72.30
18	Maia Sørensen	Denmark	105.19	19	39.62	18	65.57
19	Katherine Ona	Ecuador	63.07	20	19.81	19	43.26
WD	Alexia Paganini	Switzerland	withdrew	5	54.29	withdrew from competition	
WD	Ji Seo-yeon	South Korea	withdrew from competition				
WD	Antonina Dubinina	Serbia	withdrew from competition				

=== Ice dance ===
Rank	Team	Nation	Total points	RD		FD	
1st place, gold medalist(s)	Marjorie Lajoie / Zachary Lagha	Canada	202.40	1	82.09	1	120.31
2nd place, silver medalist(s)	Evgeniia Lopareva / Geoffrey Brissaud	France	192.85	2	76.83	2	116.02
3rd place, bronze medalist(s)	Katarina Wolfkostin / Jeffrey Chen	United States	180.46	3	72.37	3	108.09
4	Alicia Fabbri / Paul Ayer	Canada	168.86	4	70.48	5	98.38
5	Oona Brown / Gage Brown	United States	166.33	5	62.94	4	103.39
6	Mariia Nosovitskaya / Mikhail Nosovitskiy	Israel	153.50	7	57.45	6	96.05
7	Mariia Ignateva / Danijil Szemko	Hungary	150.54	9	56.07	7	94.47
8	Carolina Portesi Peroni / Michael Chrastecky	Italy	146.93	6	60.42	8	86.51
9	Lara Luft / Maximilian Pfisterer	Germany	142.41	8	57.10	9	83.51
10	Anastasia Polibina / Pavel Golovishnikov	Poland	139.63	10	56.04	10	83.59
11	Lou Terreaux / Noé Perron	France	138.14	11	55.30	11	82.54
12	Charise Matthaei / Max Liebers	Germany	130.53	13	48.48	12	82.05
13	Denisa Cimlová / Joti Polizoakis	Czech Republic	128.04	12	54.43	13	73.61
14	India Nette / Eron Westwood	Australia	106.51	15	42.00	14	64.51
WD	Lucy Hancock / Ilias Fourati	Hungary	withdrew	14	48.10	withdrew from competition	
