= 2024 CS Budapest Trophy =

International figure skating competition

- Type: ISU Challenger Series
- Date: October 11 – 13
- Season: 2024–25
- Location: Budapest, Hungary
- Host: Hungarian National Skating Federation
- Venue: Vasas Jégcentrum

Champions
- Men's singles: (Italy) Matteo Rizzo
- Women's singles: (United States) Alysa Liu
- Ice dance: (United States) Christina Carreira and Anthony Ponomarenko
- Previous: 2023 CS Budapest Trophy
- Next: 2026 CS Budapest Trophy
- Previous CS: 2024 CS Denis Ten Memorial Challenge
- Next CS: 2024 CS Trophée Métropole Nice Côte d'Azur

The 2024 CS Budapest Trophy was held on October 11–13, 2024, in Budapest, Hungary. It was part of the 2024–25 ISU Challenger Series. Medals were awarded in men's singles, women's singles, and ice dance.

== Entries ==
The International Skating Union published the list of entries on September 22, 2024.

Country	Men	Women	Ice dance
Armenia	Fedor Chitipakhovian	—N/a	Viktoriia Azroian; Artur Gruzdev
Australia	—N/a		Holly Harris; Jason Chan
Bulgaria	Filip Kaymakchiev	—N/a	
Canada	—N/a	Madeline Schizas	Marjorie Lajoie; Zachary Lagha
China	—N/a		Ren Junfei; Xing Jianing
Croatia	—N/a	Hana Cvijanović	—N/a
Denmark	—N/a		Elisabetta Incardona; Rafael Marc Drozd Musil
Estonia	—N/a	Eva-Lotta Kiibus	—N/a
Finland	Makar Suntsev	Janna Jyrkinen	Daniela Ivanitskiy; Matthew Sperry
Finland	—N/a		Yuka Orihara; Juho Pirinen
Finland	—N/a		Juulia Turkkila; Matthias Versluis
France	—N/a	Lorine Schild	—N/a
Germany	Nikita Starostin	Kristina Isaev	Charise Matthaei; Max Liebers
Germany	—N/a	Sarah Marie Pesch	—N/a
Great Britain	—N/a	Kristen Spours	—N/a
Hungary	Aleksandr Vlasenko	Regina Schermann	Emese Csiszer; Mark Shapiro
Hungary	—N/a	Cintia Szabo	Mariia Ignateva; Danijil Leonyidovics Szemko
Hungary	—N/a	Katinka Anna Zsembery	—N/a
Hungary	—N/a	Daria Zsirnov	—N/a
Italy	Matteo Rizzo	—N/a	Carlotta Argentieri; Francesco Riva
Italy	—N/a	—N/a	Giulia Isabella Paolino; Andrea Tuba
Lithuania	—N/a		Paulina Ramanauskaitė; Deividas Kizala
Mexico	—N/a		Ava Valentina Aversano Martinez; Christian Bennett
Netherlands	—N/a	Niki Wories	—N/a
Poland	Vladimir Samoilov	Laura Szczesna	Olexandra Borysova; Aaron Freeman
Poland	Kornel Witkowski	—N/a	
Romania	—N/a	Julia Sauter	—N/a
South Africa	—N/a	Gian-Quen Isaacs	—N/a
Slovakia	—N/a	Ema Doboszová	Mária Sofia Pucherová; Nikita Lysak
Spain	—N/a		Philomene Sabourin; Raul Bermejo
Switzerland	Lukas Britschgi	Sara Franzi	Arianna Sassi; Luca Morini
Switzerland	—N/a	Kimmy Repond	—N/a
Turkey	Burak Demirboğa	—N/a	Katarina Delcamp; Berk Akalın
Turkey	Ali Efe Gunes	—N/a	—N/a
Turkey	Alp Eren Ozkan	—N/a	—N/a
Ukraine	—N/a		Mariia Pinchuk; Mykyta Pogorielov
United States	—N/a	Alysa Liu	Emily Bratti; Ian Somerville
United States	—N/a	Lindsay Thorngren	Christina Carreira; Anthony Ponomarenko

=== Changes to preliminary assignments ===
Date	Discipline	Withdrew	Added	Ref.
September 28	Men	(Germany); Arthur Wolfgang Mai	(Armenia); Fedor Chitipakhovian	
September 28	Women	—N/a	(Croatia); Hana Cvijanovic	
September 28	Ice dance	(Poland); Sofiia Dovhal; Wiktor Kulesza	—N/a	
October 3	Ice dance	(France); Loïcia Demougeot; Théo le Mercier	—N/a	
October 9	Men	(Switzerland); Georgii Pavlov	—N/a	
October 9	Women	(Finland); Emmi Peltonen	—N/a	
October 9	Ice dance	(South Korea); Hannah Lim; Ye Quan	—N/a	
October 10	Women	(Estonia); Olesja Leonova	—N/a	

== Results ==
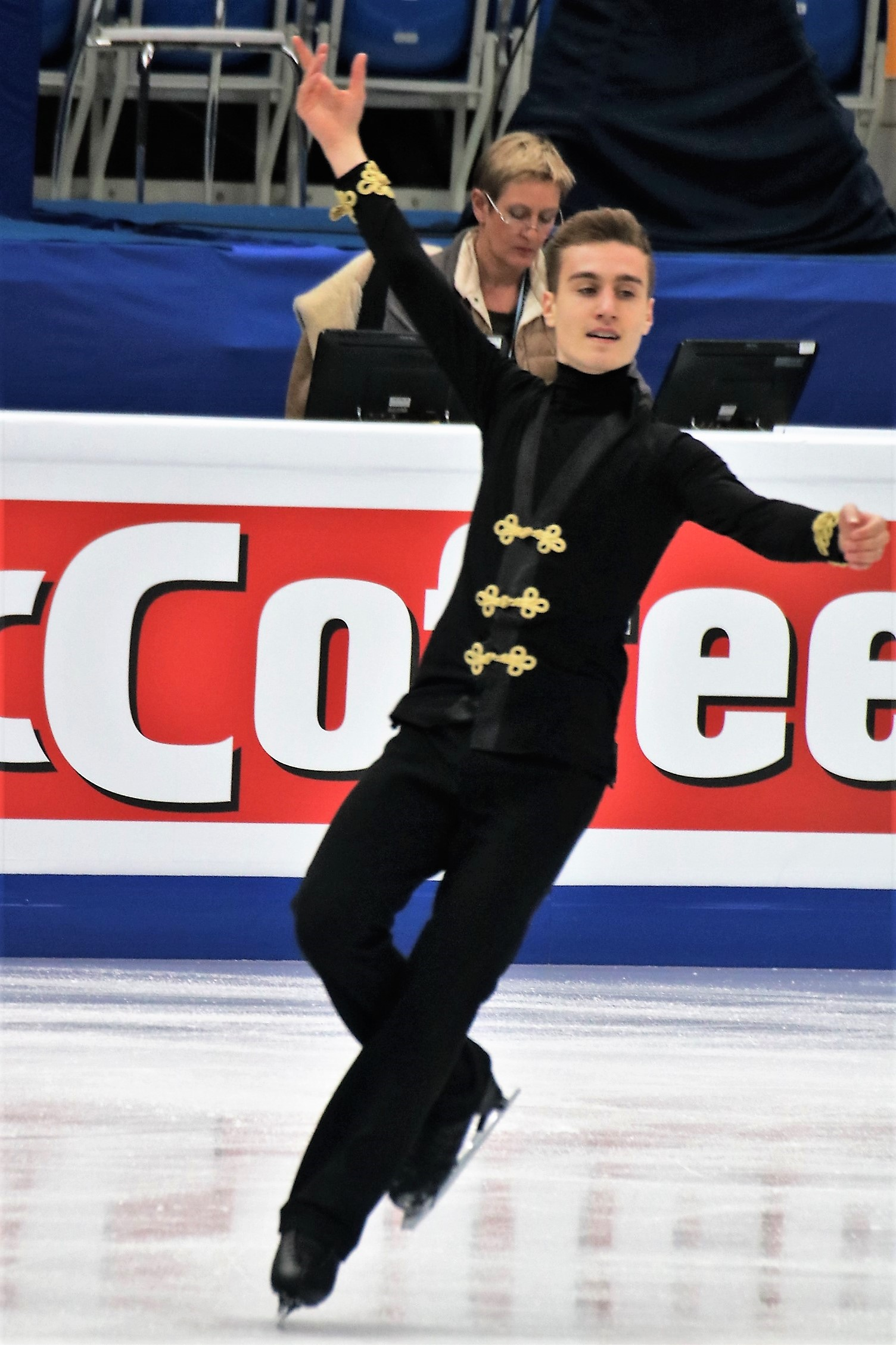
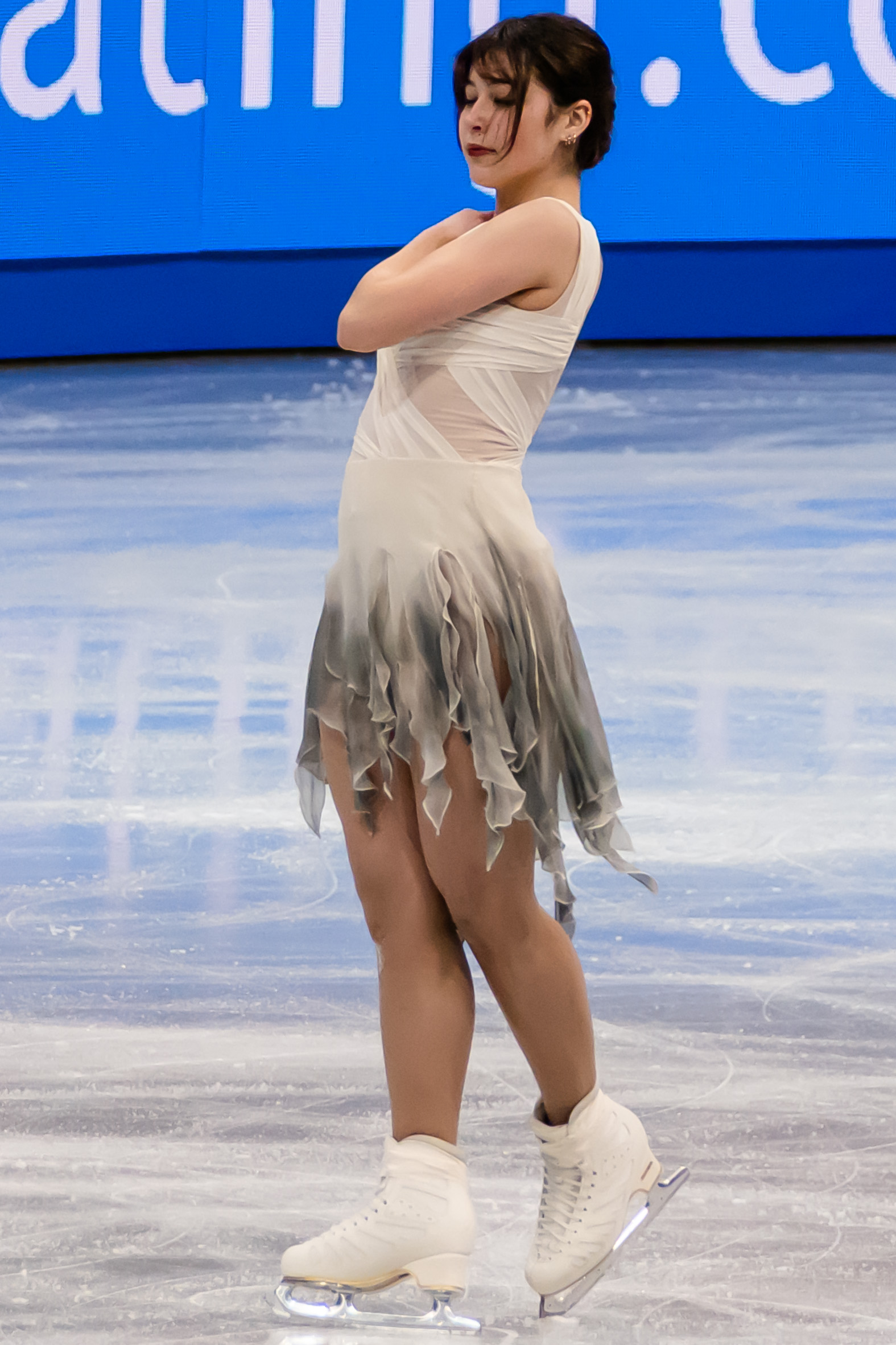
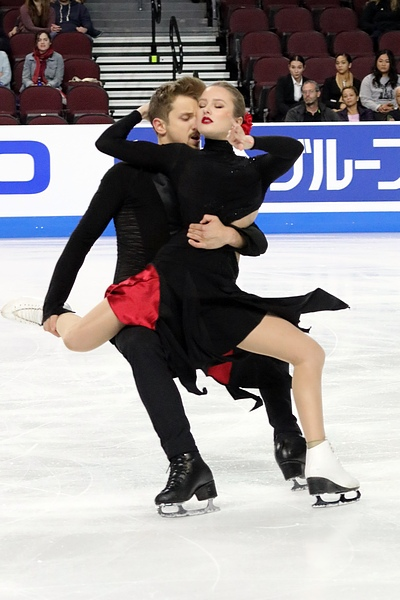
The 2024 Budapest Trophy champions: Matteo Rizzo of Italy (men's singles); Alysa Liu of the United States (women's singles); and Christina Carreira and Anthony Ponomarenko of the United States (ice dance)

=== Men's singles ===
Men's results
Rank	Skater	Nation	Total points	SP		FS	
1st place, gold medalist(s)	Matteo Rizzo	Italy	247.26	1	84.77	1	162.49
2nd place, silver medalist(s)	Lukas Britschgi	Switzerland	238.02	2	82.92	2	155.10
3rd place, bronze medalist(s)	Nikita Starostin	Germany	199.08	6	62.76	3	136.32
4	Kornel Witkowski	Poland	196.13	3	70.31	5	125.82
5	Makar Suntsev	Finland	194.62	5	64.79	4	129.83
6	Aleksandr Vlasenko	Hungary	187.03	4	65.27	6	121.76
7	Alp Eren Özkan	Turkey	176.59	7	62.52	8	114.07
8	Vladimir Samoilov	Poland	175.83	8	60.58	7	115.25
9	Burak Demirboğa	Turkey	166.62	10	55.02	9	111.60
10	Ali Efe Güneș	Turkey	135.92	9	57.28	11	78.64
11	Filip Kaymakchiev	Bulgaria	132.73	11	47.61	10	85.12

=== Women's singles ===
Women's results
Rank	Skater	Nation	Total points	SP		FS	
1st place, gold medalist(s)	Alysa Liu	United States	192.77	1	68.83	2	123.94
2nd place, silver medalist(s)	Kimmy Repond	Switzerland	190.09	3	66.04	1	124.05
3rd place, bronze medalist(s)	Lorine Schild	France	179.70	5	63.48	3	116.22
4	Lindsay Thorngren	United States	179.45	2	66.19	4	113.26
5	Madeline Schizas	Canada	175.71	4	65.21	5	110.50
6	Julia Sauter	Romania	157.75	6	62.98	11	94.77
7	Katinka Zsembery	Hungary	153.61	8	53.74	8	99.87
8	Janna Jyrkinen	Finland	152.34	7	57.26	9	95.08
9	Niki Wories	Netherlands	148.98	11	47.22	6	101.76
10	Kristina Isaev	Germany	142.29	10	47.31	10	94.98
11	Ema Doboszová	Slovakia	140.58	12	47.00	12	93.58
12	Kristen Spours	Great Britain	138.93	17	38.16	7	100.77
13	Regina Schermann	Hungary	132.95	9	51.59	15	81.36
14	Sara Franzi	Switzerland	126.79	13	45.36	14	81.43
15	Laura Szczesna	Poland	122.36	15	43.76	16	78.60
16	Daria Zsirnov	Hungary	121.74	14	44.31	17	77.43
17	Gian-Quen Isaacs	South Africa	120.37	19	37.13	13	83.24
18	Sarah Marie Pesch	Germany	114.04	16	40.69	18	73.35
19	Eva-Lotta Kiibus	Estonia	99.25	18	37.16	19	62.09
20	Cintia Szabo	Hungary	86.13	20	36.45	20	49.68

=== Ice dance ===
Ice dance results
Rank	Skater	Nation	Total points	RD		FD	
1st place, gold medalist(s)	Christina Carreira; Anthony Ponomarenko	United States	194.69	1	77.44	1	117.25
2nd place, silver medalist(s)	Emily Bratti; Ian Somerville	United States	189.91	2	74.92	3	114.99
3rd place, bronze medalist(s)	Juulia Turkkila; Matthias Versluis	Finland	189.01	3	72.34	2	116.67
4	Yuka Orihara; Juho Pirinen	Finland	178.50	5	70.25	4	108.25
5	Mariia Ignateva; Danijil Szemko	Hungary	174.95	4	71.75	6	103.20
6	Mária Sofia Pucherová; Nikita Lysak	Slovakia	169.18	6	69.56	8	99.62
7	Holly Harris; Jason Chan	Australia	169.14	8	65.68	5	103.46
8	Charise Matthaei; Max Liebers	Germany	166.41	9	65.24	7	101.17
9	Giulia Paolino; Andrea Tuba	Italy	162.61	7	66.19	9	96.42
10	Paulina Ramanauskaitė; Deividas Kizala	Lithuania	156.01	10	62.52	11	93.49
11	Ren Junfei; Xing Jianing	China	152.93	12	57.79	10	95.14
12	Mariia Pinchuk; Mykyta Pogorielov	Ukraine	152.40	11	60.62	12	91.78
13	Carlotta Argentieri; Francesco Riva	Italy	143.28	13	57.76	13	85.52
14	Philomène Sabourin; Raúl Bermejo	Spain	135.45	15	53.51	16	81.94
15	Viktoriia Azroian; Artur Gruzdev	Armenia	133.58	16	52.17	17	81.41
16	Arianna Sassi; Luca Morini	Switzerland	130.92	14	53.97	20	76.95
17	Emese Csiszèr; Mark Shapiro	Hungary	130.86	17	48.75	15	82.11
18	Ava Aversano Martinez; Christian Bennett	Mexico	125.75	18	47.83	19	77.92
19	Olexandra Borysova; Aaron Freeman	Poland	124.48	19	42.25	14	82.23
20	Daniela Ivanitskiy; Matthew Sperry	Finland	121.94	20	41.87	18	80.07
21	Elisabetta Incardona; Rafael Marc Drozd Musil	Denmark	104.99	21	38.09	21	66.90
