= Budapest Trophy =

International figure skating competition

- Status: Active
- Genre: International competition
- Frequency: Annual
- Venue: Vasas Jégcentrum
- Location: Budapest
- Country: Hungary
- Inaugurated: 2020
- Previous event: 2026 Budapest Trophy
- Organizer: Hungarian National Skating Federation

The Budapest Trophy is an annual figure skating competition sanctioned by the International Skating Union (ISU), organized and hosted by the Hungarian National Skating Federation (Hungarian: Magyar Országos Korcsolyázó Szövetség) at the Vasas Jégcentrum in Budapest, Hungary. The competition debuted in 2020 amidst the COVID-19 pandemic. The Budapest Trophy has been an Challenger Series event four times during its history as of 2025. Medals are awarded in men's singles, women's singles, pair skating, and ice dance at the senior and junior levels, although each discipline may not necessarily be held every year, and when the event is part of the Challenger Series, skaters earn points towards the World Standings and Season's World Ranking based on their results.

== History ==
The ISU Challenger Series was introduced in 2014. It is a series of international figure skating competitions sanctioned by the International Skating Union (ISU) and organized by ISU member nations. The objective is to ensure consistent organization and structure within a series of international competitions linked together, providing opportunities for senior-level skaters to compete at the international level and also earn points towards the World Standings and Season's World Ranking. When an event is held as part of the Challenger Series, it must host at least three of the four disciplines (men's singles, women's singles, pair skating, and ice dance) and representatives from at least ten different ISU member nations. The minimum number of entrants required for each discipline is eight skaters each in men's singles and women's singles, five teams in pair skating, and six teams in ice dance. Each ISU member nation is eligible to enter up to three skaters or teams per discipline in each competition, although the Hungarian National Skating Federation may enter an unlimited number of entrants in their own event.

The inaugural edition of the Budapest Trophy was intended to be the sixth event of the 2020–21 Challenger Series, however all but two of the events were ultimately cancelled due to the COVID-19 pandemic: the 2020 Nebelhorn Trophy and the 2020 Budapest Trophy. On 13 July, the ISU announced that the remaining Challenger Series events would be treated as separate individual competitions rather than part of a series; as a result, no Challenger Series ranking would be determined and no prize money distributed at the end of the series, although skaters could still earn Challenger Series points towards the World Standings and Season's World Ranking. However, the ISU later revised their decision on 3 August, announcing that world ranking points would not be awarded due to the limited nature of the competitions. On 1 October, the Hungarian National Skating Federation released a statement detailing the Hungarian government's COVID-19 regulations for competitors seeking to gain entry to Hungary. The 2020 Budapest Trophy was held from 15 to 17 October at the Vasas Jégcentrum. Only 300 spectators were allowed into the arena each day, with temperatures taken prior to admittance and strict requirements for the wearing of masks. The Budapest Trophy has been held every year since, although the 2021 and 2025 editions were not part of the Challenger Series.

== Senior medalists ==
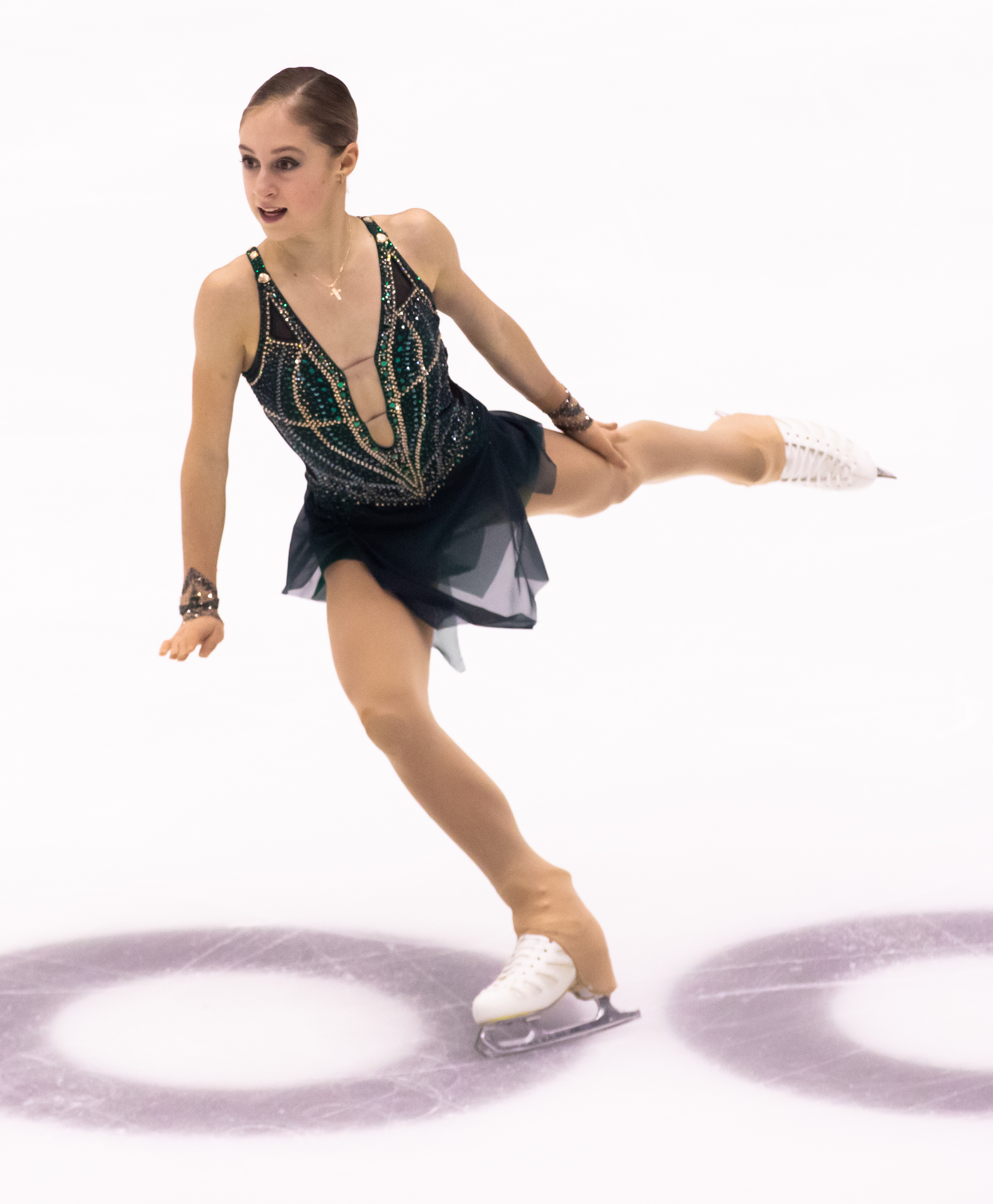
The 2026 Budapest Trophy champions (from left to right): Daniel Grassl of Italy (men's singles); Alina Gorbacheva of Russia (women's singles); and Natálie Taschlerová and Filip Taschler of the Czech Republic (ice dance)

CS: Challenger Series event

=== Men's singles ===
Men's event medalists
Year	Gold	Silver	Bronze	Ref.
2020 CS	(Italy) Daniel Grassl	(Turkey) Burak Demirboğa	(Estonia) Aleksandr Selevko	
2021	(Italy) Matteo Rizzo	(Russia) Dmitri Aliev	(Russia) Alexander Samarin	
2022 CS	(Italy) Matteo Rizzo	(Switzerland) Lukas Britschgi	(Italy) Nikolaj Memola	
2023 CS	(Italy) Nikolaj Memola	(Switzerland) Lukas Britschgi	(United States) Tomoki Hiwatashi	
2024 CS	(Italy) Matteo Rizzo	(Switzerland) Lukas Britschgi	(Germany) Nikita Starostin	
2025	(France) Landry Le May	(Switzerland) Georgii Pavlov	(Germany) Arthur Wolfgang Mai	
2026 CS	(Italy) Daniel Grassl	(United States) Patrick Blackwell	(Switzerland) Lukas Britschgi	

=== Women's singles ===
Women's event medalists
Year	Gold	Silver	Bronze	Ref.
2020 CS	(Belgium) Loena Hendrickx	(Estonia) Eva-Lotta Kiibus	(Bulgaria) Alexandra Feigin	
2021	(Russia) Maya Khromykh	(Russia) Anna Shcherbakova	(Russia) Sofia Samodurova	
2022 CS	(United States) Ava Marie Ziegler	(Switzerland) Kimmy Repond	(Estonia) Niina Petrõkina	
2023 CS	(United States) Bradie Tennell	(France) Léa Serna	(United States) Clare Seo	
2024 CS	(United States) Alysa Liu	(Switzerland) Kimmy Repond	(France) Lorine Schild	
2025	(Poland) Ekaterina Kurakova	(Moldova) Anastasia Gracheva	(Norway) Mia Risa Gomez	
2026 CS	(Individual Neutral Athletes) Alina Gorbacheva	(Romania) Julia Sauter	(Switzerland) Kimmy Repond	

=== Pairs ===
Pairs event medalists
Year	Gold	Silver	Bronze	Ref.
2020	No pairs competition			
2021	(Russia); Karina Akopova; Nikita Rakhmanin	(Georgia (country)); Anastasiia Metelkina; Daniil Parkman	(Hungary); Ioulia Chtchetinina; Márk Magyar	
2022	No pairs competition			
2023	(Germany); Minerva Fabienne Hase; Nikita Volodin	(Hungary); Maria Pavlova; Alexei Sviatchenko	(Netherlands); Daria Danilova; Michel Tsiba	
2024–26	No pairs competitions			

=== Ice dance ===
Ice dance event medalists
Year	Gold	Silver	Bronze	Ref.
2020 CS	(Ukraine); Oleksandra Nazarova; Maksym Nikitin	(Germany); Katharina Müller; Tim Dieck	(United Kingdom); Sasha Fear; George Waddell	
2021	(Armenia); Tina Garabedian; Simon Proulx-Sénécal	(Lithuania); Allison Reed; Saulius Ambrulevičius	(Russia); Elizaveta Shanaeva; Devid Naryzhnyy	
2022 CS	(Canada); Marjorie Lajoie; Zachary Lagha	(France); Evgeniia Lopareva; Geoffrey Brissaud	(United States); Katarina Wolfkostin; Jeffrey Chen	
2023 CS	(Georgia (country)); Diana Davis; Gleb Smolkin	(Canada); Marie-Jade Lauriault; Romain Le Gac	(France); Loïcia Demougeot; Théo le Mercier	
2024 CS	(United States); Christina Carreira; Anthony Ponomarenko	(United States); Emily Bratti; Ian Somerville	(Finland); Juulia Turkkila; Matthias Versluis	
2025	(Canada); Marjorie Lajoie; Zachary Lagha	(Hungary); Mariia Ignateva; Danijil Szemko	(Italy); Giulia Isabella Paolino; Andrea Tuba	
2026 CS	(Czech Republic); Natálie Taschlerová; Filip Taschler	(Spain); Olivia Smart; Tim Dieck	(Finland); Yuka Orihara; Juho Pirinen	

== Junior results ==
=== Men's singles ===
Junior men's event medalists
Year	Gold	Silver	Bronze	Ref.
2020	(Estonia) Arlet Levandi	(Slovakia) Marko Piliar	(Turkey) Alp Eren Özkan	
2021	(Slovakia) Lukas Vaclavik	(Hungary) Mózes József Berei	(France) Corentin Spinar	
2022	(Sweden) Erik Pellnor	(Ukraine) Mark Kulish	(Australia) Julio Potapenko	
2023	(Germany) Hugo Willi Herrmann	(France) Gianni Motilla	(Latvia) Kirills Korkacs	
2024	(Slovakia) Lukas Václavík	(France) Gianni Motilla	(Poland) Oscar Oliver	
2025	(Czech Republic) Tadeas Václavík	(Slovakia) Lukáš Václavík	(Austria) Maksym Petrychenko	
2026	(Israel) Kirill Sheiko	(Individual Neutral Athletes) Ilia Malkov	(Switzerland) Gion Schmid	

=== Women's singles ===
Junior women's event medalists
Year	Gold	Silver	Bronze	Ref.
2020	(Ukraine) Anastasiia Shabotova	(Lithuania) Marija Brejeva	(Estonia) Amalia Zelenjak	
2021	(Hungary) Vivien Papp	(Russia) Karolina Kogan	(Finland) Pihla Bergman	
2022	(South Korea) Lee Hyorin	(Hungary) Léna Ekker	(Hungary) Katinka Anna Zsembery	
2023	(United States) Logan Higase-Chen	(Austria) Hannah Frank	(Hungary) Polina Dzsumanyijazova	
2024	(Slovakia) Alica Lengyelová	(Hungary) Polina Dzsumanyijazova	(Switzerland) Anastasia Brandenburg	
2025	(Slovakia) Alica Lengyelová	(Hungary) Polina Dzsumanyijazova	(Slovakia) Olivia Lengyelová	
2026	(Georgia (country)) Amaliia Nasybullina	(Switzerland) Leandra Tzimpoukakis	(Switzerland) Mayuka Süess	

=== Pairs ===
Junior pairs event medalists
Year	Gold	Silver	Bronze	Ref.
2020	No junior pairs competition			
2021	(Russia); Ekaterina Geynish; Ilya Mironov	(Russia); Anastasia Kostyuk; Dmitrii Chigirev	(Italy); Alyssa Montan; Filippo Clerici	
2022–23	No junior pairs competitions			
2024	(France); Louise Ehrhard; Matthis Pellegris	(Czech Republic); Debora Anna Cohen; Lukáš Vochozka	(Switzerland); Chiara Michaela Pazienza; Maxim Knorr	
2025–26	No junior pairs competitions			

=== Ice dance ===
Junior ice dance event medalists
Year	Gold	Silver	Bronze	Ref.
2020	(Ukraine); Mariia Holubtsova; Kyryl Bielobrov	(Ukraine); Mariia Pinchuk; Mykyta Pogorielov	(Hungary); Katica Kedves; Fedor Sharonov	
2021	(Russia); Polina Kocherygina; Evgeniy Artyuschenko	(Russia); Varvara Kurnosenko; Fedor Varlamov	(Russia); Olga Fedorova; Nikita Ivanov	
2022	(Poland); Sofiia Dovhal; Wiktor Kulesza	(France); Emie Lefebvre; Louis Varescon	(France); Ambre Perrier Gianesini; Samuel Blanc Klaperman	
2023	(Ukraine); Iryna Pidgaina; Artem Koval	(Poland); Sofiia Dovhal; Wiktor Kulesza	(Czech Republic); Andrea Psurna; Jáchym Novák	
2024	(Ukraine); Iryna Pidgaina; Artem Koval	(Switzerland); Gina Zehnder; Beda Leon Sieber	(France); Eva Bernard; Amedeo Bonetto	
2025	(Ukraine); Iryna Pidgaina; Artem Koval	(France); Léa Hienne; Louis Varescon	(Germany); Eniko Kobor; Zoard Kobor	
2026	(United States); Hana Maria Aboian; Daniil Veselukhin	(Italy); Zoe Bianchi; Daniel Basile	(United States); Aneta Vaclavikova; William Lissauer	

== Cumulative medal count (senior medalists) ==
=== Men's singles ===
Total number of Budapest Trophy medals in men's singles by nation
Rank	Nation	Gold	Silver	Bronze	Total
1	Italy	6	0	1	7
2	France	1	0	0	1
3	Switzerland	0	4	1	5
4	Russia	0	1	1	2
4	United States	0	1	1	2
6	Turkey	0	1	0	1
7	Germany	0	0	2	2
8	Estonia	0	0	1	1
Totals (8 entries)		7	7	7	21

=== Women's singles ===
Total number of Budapest Trophy medals in women's singles by nation
Rank	Nation	Gold	Silver	Bronze	Total
1	United States	3	0	1	4
2	Russia	1	1	1	3
3	Belgium	1	0	0	1
3	Individual Neutral Athletes	1	0	0	1
3	Poland	1	0	0	1
6	Switzerland	0	2	1	3
7	Estonia	0	1	1	2
7	France	0	1	1	2
9	Moldova	0	1	0	1
9	Romania	0	1	0	1
11	Bulgaria	0	0	1	1
11	Norway	0	0	1	1
Totals (12 entries)		7	7	7	21

=== Pairs ===
Total number of Budapest Trophy medals in pairs by nation
Rank	Nation	Gold	Silver	Bronze	Total
1	Germany	1	0	0	1
1	Russia	1	0	0	1
3	Hungary	0	1	1	2
4	Georgia	0	1	0	1
5	Netherlands	0	0	1	1
Totals (5 entries)		2	2	2	6

=== Ice dance ===
Total number of Budapest Trophy medals in ice dance by nation
Rank	Nation	Gold	Silver	Bronze	Total
1	United States	1	1	1	3
2	Canada	1	1	0	2
3	Armenia	1	0	0	1
3	Czech Republic	1	0	0	1
3	Georgia	1	0	0	1
3	Ukraine	1	0	0	1
7	France	0	1	1	2
8	Germany	0	1	0	1
8	Lithuania	0	1	0	1
8	Spain	0	1	0	1
11	Finland	0	0	2	2
12	Great Britain	0	0	1	1
12	Russia	0	0	1	1
Totals (13 entries)		6	6	6	18

=== Total medals ===
Total number of Budapest Trophy medals by nation
Rank	Nation	Gold	Silver	Bronze	Total
1	Italy	6	0	1	7
2	United States	4	2	3	9
3	Russia	2	2	3	7
4	France	1	2	2	5
5	Germany	1	1	2	4
6	Canada	1	1	0	2
6	Georgia	1	1	0	2
8	Armenia	1	0	0	1
8	Belgium	1	0	0	1
8	Czech Republic	1	0	0	1
8	Individual Neutral Athletes	1	0	0	1
8	Poland	1	0	0	1
8	Ukraine	1	0	0	1
14	Switzerland	0	6	2	8
15	Estonia	0	1	2	3
16	Hungary	0	1	1	2
17	Lithuania	0	1	0	1
17	Moldova	0	1	0	1
17	Romania	0	1	0	1
17	Spain	0	1	0	1
17	Turkey	0	1	0	1
22	Finland	0	0	2	2
23	Bulgaria	0	0	1	1
23	Great Britain	0	0	1	1
23	Netherlands	0	0	1	1
23	Norway	0	0	1	1
Totals (26 entries)		22	22	22	66
