= 2024 Four Nationals Figure Skating Championships =

Figure skating competition

- Type: National championships
- Date: December 14 – 16, 2023
- Season: 2023–24
- Location: Turnov, Czech Republic
- Host: Czech Figure Skating Association
- Venue: Zimni stadion Ludvika Koska

Champions
- Men's singles: (Czech Republic) Georgii Reshtenko (Hungary) Alexandr Vlasenko (Poland) Vladimir Samoliv (Slovakia) Adam Hagara
- Women's singles: (Czech Republic) Barbora Vrankova (Hungary) Regina Schermann (Poland) Ekaterina Kurakova (Slovakia) Vanessa Selmekova
- Pairs: (Czech Republic) Barbora Kucianova / Martin Bidař (Hungary) Mária Pavlova / Alexei Sviatchenko (Poland) Ioulia Chtchetinina / Michal Wozniak
- Ice dance: (Czech Republic) Kateřina Mrázková / Daniel Mrázek (Hungary) Mariia Ignateva / Danijil Szemko (Poland) Olivia Oliver / Filip Bojanowski (Slovakia) Maria Sofia Pucherová / Nikita Lysak
- Previous: 2023 Four Nationals Championships
- Next: 2025 Four Nationals Championships

The 2024 Four Nationals Figure Skating Championships included the Czech Republic, Slovakia, Poland, and Hungary. It took place on December 14-16, 2023 in Turnov, Czech Republic. The results were split by country; the three highest-placing skaters from each country formed their national podiums in men's singles, women's singles, pair skating, and ice dancing. The results were among the criteria used to determine international assignments.

== Entries ==
Country	Men	Women	Pairs	Ice dance
Czech Republic	Georgii Reshtenko; Filip Scerba	Eliška Březinová; Sara Parkosova; Barbora Vránková; Michaela Vrašťáková	Barbora Kucianova / Martin Bidař	Kateřina Mrázková / Daniel Mrázek
Hungary	Aleksandr Vlasenko; Aleksei Vlasenko	Regina Schermann; Anna Katinka Zsembery; Dária Zsirnov	Mária Pavlova / Alexei Sviatchenko	Emese Csiszér / Mark Shapiro; Lucy Hancock / Ilias Fourati; Mariia Ignateva / Danijil Szemko
Poland	Jakub Lofek; Vladimir Samoilov; Kornel Witkowski; Miłosz Witkowski; Matvii Yefymenko	Ekaterina Kurakova; Agnieszka Rejment; Laura Szczęsna	Ioulia Chtchetinina / Michal Wozniak	Olexandra Borysova / Aaron Freeman; Sofiia Dovhal / Wiktor Kulesza Olivia Oliver / Filip Bojanowski; Anastasia Polibina / Pavel Golovishnikov
Slovakia	Adam Hagara; Lukas Vaclavik	Ema Doboszová; Simona Kolenáková; Vanesa Šelmeková		Mária Sofia Pucherová / Nikita Lysak; Anna Simova / Kirill Aksenov

== Medals summary ==
=== Senior medalists ===
==== Czech Republic ====
Discipline	Gold	Silver	Bronze
Men	Georgii Reshtenko	Filip Scerba	—N/a
Women	Barbora Vránková	Eliška Březinová	Michaela Vrastakova
Pairs	Barbora Kucianova / Martin Bidař	—N/a	
Ice dance	Kateřina Mrázková / Daniel Mrázek	—N/a	

==== Hungary ====
Discipline	Gold	Silver	Bronze
Men	Aleksandr Vlasenko	Aleksei Vlasenko	—N/a
Women	Regina Schermann	Dária Zsirnov	Katinka Anna Zsembery
Pairs	Mária Pavlova / Aleksei Sviatchenko	—N/a	
Ice dance	Mariia Ignateva / Danijil Szemko	Lucy Hancock / Ilias Fourati	Emese Csiszer / Mark Shapiro

==== Poland ====
Discipline	Gold	Silver	Bronze
Men	Vladimir Samoilov	Matvii Yefymenko	Jakub Lofek
Women	Ekaterina Kurakova	Laura Szczesna	Karolina Białas
Pairs	Ioulia Chtchetinina / Michal Wozniak	—N/a	
Ice dance	Olivia Oliver / Filip Bojanowski	Sofiia Dovhal / Wiktor Kulesza	Anastasia Polibina / Pavel Golovishnikov

==== Slovakia ====
Discipline	Gold	Silver	Bronze
Men	Adam Hagara	Lukas Vaclavik	—N/a
Women	Vanessa Selmekova	Ema Doboszová	Simona Kolenáková
Ice dance	Mária Sofia Pucherová / Nikita Lysak	Anna Simova / Kirill Aksenov	—N/a

=== Junior medalists ===
==== Czech Republic ====
Discipline	Gold	Silver	Bronze
Pairs	Debora Anna Cohen / Lukas Vochozka	—N/a	
Ice dance	Eliška Žáková / Filip Mencl	Natalie Blaasová / Filip Blaass	Lauren Audrey Batkova / Jacob Yang

==== Hungary ====
Discipline	Gold	Silver	Bronze
Ice dance	Villo Mira Szilagyi / Istvan Jaracs	—N/a	

==== Slovakia ====
Discipline	Gold	Silver	Bronze
Pairs	Nikola Sitková / Oliver Kubacák	—N/a	

== Senior results ==
=== Men ===
Rank	Name	Nation	Total points	SP		FS	
1	Adam Hagara	Slovakia	208.93	1	73.88	1	135.05
2	Georgii Reshtenko	Czech Republic	201.17	2	68.51	2	132.66
3	Vladimir Samoilov	Poland	192.01	5	62.64	3	129.37
4	Aleksandr Vlasenko	Hungary	189.29	4	66.03	4	123.26
5	Matvii Yefymenko	Poland	181.75	6	62.15	5	119.60
6	Filip Scerba	Czech Republic	174.26	3	67.18	8	107.08
7	Jakub Lofek	Poland	173.99	8	58.84	6	115.15
8	Kornel Witkowski	Poland	169.40	7	60.68	7	108.72
9	Miłosz Witkowski	Poland	150.05	9	58.70	10	91.35
10	Lukas Vaclavik	Slovakia	150.05	10	46.32	9	101.63
11	Aleksei Vlasenko	Hungary	125.89	11	37.77	11	88.12

=== Women ===
Rank	Name	Nation	Total points	SP		FS	
1	Ekaterina Kurakova	Poland	171.10	1	62.04	1	109.06
2	Vanessa Selmekova	Slovakia	157.77	4	53.97	2	103.80
3	Barbora Vránková	Czech Republic	155.33	5	53.22	3	102.11
4	Ema Doboszová	Slovakia	144.49	3	54.79	5	89.70
5	Eliška Březinová	Czech Republic	144.12	2	57.71	6	86.41
6	Laura Szczęsna	Poland	136.43	7	46.29	4	90.14
7	Regina Schermann	Hungary	133.71	6	48.45	7	85.26
8	Dária Zsirnov	Hungary	129.73	10	44.61	8	85.12
9	Karolina Białas	Poland	126.11	8	46.18	9	79.93
10	Katinka Anna Zsembery	Hungary	121.44	9	45.78	10	75.66
11	Michaela Vrašťáková	Czech Republic	113.18	11	42.84	11	70.34
12	Sara Parkosova	Czech Republic	105.92	13	36.14	12	69.78
13	Agnieszka Rejment	Poland	102.44	12	37.09	14	65.35
14	Simona Kolenáková	Slovakia	96.22	14	28.56	13	67.66

=== Pairs ===
Rank	Name	Nation	Total points	SP		FS	
1	Mária Pavlova / Alexei Sviatchenko	Hungary	196.18	1	64.87	1	131.31
2	Ioulia Chtchetinina / Michal Wozniak	Poland	161.58	3	55.11	2	106.47
3	Barbora Kucianova / Martin Bidař	Czech Republic	151.84	2	56.07	3	95.77

=== Ice dance ===
Rank	Name	Nation	Total points	RD		FD	
1	Kateřina Mrázková / Daniel Mrázek	Czech Republic	190.77	1	74.86	1	115.91
2	Mária Sofia Pucherová / Nikita Lysak	Slovakia	166.27	3	65.56	3	100.71
3	Anna Simova / Kirill Aksenov	Slovakia	164.17	4	62.09	2	102.08
4	Mariia Ignateva / Danijil Szemko	Hungary	162.32	2	65.58	4	96.74
5	Olivia Oliver / Filip Bojanowski	Poland	155.71	5	61.42	6	94.29
6	Sofia Dovhal / Wiktor Kulesza	Poland	146.18	9	56.54	6	89.64
7	Anastasia Polibina / Pavel Golovishnikov	Poland	145.59	6	58.15	8	87.44
8	Lucy Hancock / Ilias Fourati	Hungary	145.48	7	57.26	7	88.22
9	Emese Csiszer / Mark Shapiro	Hungary	141.29	8	56.72	9	84.57
10	Olexandra Borysova / Aaron Freeman	Poland	127.16	10	46.11	10	81.05

== Junior results ==
=== Pairs ===
Rank	Name	Nation	Total points	SP		FS	
1	Debora Anna Cohen / Lukas Vochozka	Czech Republic	137.58	1	47.33	1	90.25
2	Nikola Sitková / Oliver Kubacák	Slovakia	100.16	2	37.88	2	62.28

=== Ice Dance ===
Rank	Name	Nation	Total points	RD		FD	
1	Eliška Žáková / Filip Mencl	Czech Republic	137.73	1	53.78	1	83.95
2	Natalie Blaasová / Filip Blaass	Czech Republic	131.52	3	47.76	2	83.76
3	Lauren Audrey Batkova / Jacob Yang	Czech Republic	124.01	2	53.76	4	70.25
4	Andrea Pšurná / Jachym Novák	Czech Republic	119.98	4	45.85	3	74.13
2	Kristyna Stanclova / Karel Kostron	Czech Republic	108.10	5	40.61	5	67.49
6	Villo Mira Szilagyi / Istvan Jaracs	Hungary	83.31	6	36.26	7	47.05
10	Klara Vclkova / Tomáš Vlček	Czech Republic	81.08	7	30.46	6	50.62
