= 2025 Four Nationals Figure Skating Championships =

Figure skating competition

- Type: National championships
- Date: December 13 – 14, 2024
- Season: 2023–24
- Location: Cieszyn, Poland
- Host: Polish Figure Skating Association
- Venue: Hala Widowiskowo-Sportowa

Champions
- Men's singles: (Slovakia) Adam Hagara
- Women's singles: (Slovakia) Vanesa Šelmeková
- Pairs: (Poland) Ioulia Chtchetinina and Michał Woźniak
- Ice dance: (Czech Republic) Natálie Taschlerová and Filip Taschler
- Previous: 2024 Four Nationals Championships
- Next: 2026 Four Nationals Championships

The 2025 Four Nationals Figure Skating Championships took place from December 14–16, 2024, at the Hala Widowiskowo-Sportowa in Cieszyn, Poland. Medals were awarded in men's singles, women's singles, pair skating, and ice dance at the senior level, and pair skating and ice dance at the junior level. Skaters from the Czech Republic, Hungary, Poland, and Slovakia competed together; the results were then split by country to determine each country's national medalists. The results were part of the selection criteria for the 2025 European Championships, 2025 World Championships, and 2025 World Junior Championships.

== Medal summary ==
=== Senior level ===
| Discipline | Gold | Silver | Bronze |
|---|---|---|---|
| Men | (Slovakia); Adam Hagara | (Czech Republic); Georgii Reshtenko | (Poland); Vladimir Samoilov |
| Women | (Slovakia); Vanesa Šelmeková | (Slovakia); Ema Doboszová | (Poland); Ekaterina Kurakova |
| Pairs | (Poland); Ioulia Chtchetinina; Michał Woźniak | No other competitors | |
| Ice dance | (Czech Republic); Natálie Taschlerová; Filip Taschler | (Czech Republic); Kateřina Mrázková; Daniel Mrázek | (Slovakia); Mária Sofia Pucherová; Nikita Lysak |

=== Junior level ===
| Discipline | Gold | Silver | Bronze |
|---|---|---|---|
| Pairs | (Slovakia); Laura Hečková; Alex Války | (Czech Republic); Johanka Žilková; Matyáš Becerra | (Czech Republic); Alžběta Kvíderová; Jindřich Klement |
| Ice dance | (Slovakia); Aneta Vaclavikova; Ivan Morozov | (Poland); Eliska Zaková; Filip Mencl | (Slovakia); Lucia Stefanovova; Jacopo Boeris |

== National medalists ==
=== Senior level ===
==== Czech Republic ====
| Discipline | Gold | Silver | Bronze |
|---|---|---|---|
| Men | Georgii Reshtenko | Filip Ščerba | Petr Kotlařík |
| Women | Michaela Vrašťáková | Eliška Březinová | Barbora Vranková |
| Ice dance | Natálie Taschlerová; Filip Taschler | Kateřina Mrázková; Daniel Mrázek | —N/a |

==== Hungary ====
| Discipline | Gold | Silver | Bronze |
|---|---|---|---|
| Men | Aleksandr Vlasenko | Aleksei Vlasenko | —N/a |
| Women | Vivien Papp | Regina Schermann | —N/a |
| Ice dance | Mariia Ignateva; Danijil Szemko | Lucy Hancock; Ilias Fourati | Emese Csiszér; Mark Shapiro |

==== Poland ====
| Discipline | Gold | Silver | Bronze |
|---|---|---|---|
| Men | Vladimir Samoilov | Kornel Witkowski | Jakub Lofek |
| Women | Ekaterina Kurakova | Laura Szczęsna | Karolina Białas |
| Pairs | Ioulia Chtchetinina; Michał Woźniak | —N/a | |
| Ice dance | Sofiia Dovhal; Wiktor Kulesza | Anastasia Polibina; Pavel Golovishnikov | —N/a |

==== Slovakia ====
| Discipline | Gold | Silver | Bronze |
|---|---|---|---|
| Men | Adam Hagara | Lukáš Václavík | —N/a |
| Women | Vanesa Šelmeková | Ema Doboszová | Terézia Pócsová |
| Ice dance | Mária Sofia Pucherová; Nikita Lysak | —N/a | |

=== Junior level ===
==== Czech Republic ====
| Discipline | Gold | Silver | Bronze |
|---|---|---|---|
| Pairs | Johanka Žilková; Matyáš Becerra | Alžběta Kvíderová; Jindřich Klement | —N/a |
| Ice dance | Eliška Žáková; Filip Mencl | Natálie Blaasová; Filip Blaas | Diane Sznajder; Jáchym Novák |

==== Hungary ====
| Discipline | Gold | Silver | Bronze |
|---|---|---|---|
| Ice dance | Villö Szilágyi; Istvan Jaracs | —N/a | |

==== Slovakia ====
| Discipline | Gold | Silver | Bronze |
|---|---|---|---|
| Pairs | Laura Hečková; Alex Války | —N/a | |
| Ice dance | Aneta Václavíková; Ivan Morozov | Lucia Štefanovová; Jacopo Boeris | —N/a |

== Senior results ==
=== Men's singles ===
Men's results
| Rank | Skater | Nation | Total points | SP | | FS | |
|---|---|---|---|---|---|---|---|
| 1st place, gold medalist(s) | Adam Hagara | Slovakia | 241.02 | 1 | 78.78 | 1 | 162.24 |
| 2nd place, silver medalist(s) | Georgii Reshtenko | Czech Republic | 224.09 | 4 | 71.63 | 2 | 152.46 |
| 3rd place, bronze medalist(s) | Vladimir Samoilov | Poland | 223.14 | 2 | 76.62 | 4 | 146.52 |
| 4 | Lukáš Václavík | Slovakia | 217.47 | 6 | 68.22 | 3 | 149.25 |
| 5 | Kornel Witkowski | Poland | 215.45 | 3 | 74.82 | 5 | 140.63 |
| 6 | Aleksandr Vlasenko | Hungary | 198.00 | 7 | 67.28 | 6 | 130.62 |
| 7 | Jakub Lofek | Poland | 195.69 | 5 | 70.23 | 7 | 125.46 |
| 8 | Filip Ščerba | Czech Republic | 185.19 | 8 | 66.55 | 8 | 118.64 |
| 9 | Aleksei Vlasenko | Hungary | 153.59 | 9 | 56.13 | 9 | 97.46 |
| 10 | Petr Kotlařík | Czech Republic | 142.02 | 10 | 48.81 | 10 | 93.21 |

=== Women's singles ===
Women's results
| Rank | Skater | Nation | Total points | SP | | FS | |
|---|---|---|---|---|---|---|---|
| 1st place, gold medalist(s) | Vanesa Šelmeková | Slovakia | 175.08 | 1 | 56.93 | 1 | 118.15 |
| 2nd place, silver medalist(s) | Ema Doboszová | Slovakia | 161.20 | 2 | 56.37 | 3 | 104.83 |
| 3rd place, bronze medalist(s) | Ekaterina Kurakova | Poland | 159.75 | 6 | 50.03 | 2 | 109.72 |
| 4 | Michaela Vrašťáková | Czech Republic | 150.10 | 3 | 53.23 | 5 | 96.87 |
| 5 | Eliška Březinová | Czech Republic | 149.96 | 4 | 52.37 | 4 | 97.59 |
| 6 | Laura Szczęsna | Poland | 146.98 | 5 | 50.28 | 6 | 96.70 |
| 7 | Vivien Papp | Hungary | 137.25 | 9 | 47.86 | 9 | 89.39 |
| 8 | Karolina Białas | Poland | 134.05 | 10 | 43.41 | 8 | 90.64 |
| 9 | Regina Schermann | Hungary | 131.52 | 13 | 37.77 | 7 | 93.75 |
| 10 | Barbora Vránková | Czech Republic | 124.60 | 8 | 48.63 | 12 | 75.97 |
| 11 | Agnieszka Rejment | Poland | 117.51 | 14 | 37.68 | 10 | 79.83 |
| 12 | Terézia Pócsová | Slovakia | 113.62 | 15 | 37.12 | 11 | 76.50 |
| 13 | Magdalena Zawadzka | Poland | 113.02 | 12 | 38.02 | 13 | 75.00 |
| 14 | Sára Parkosová | Czech Republic | 103.75 | 11 | 41.99 | 14 | 61.76 |
| 15 | Catherine-Charlotte Lapierre | Poland | 84.96 | 16 | 27.71 | 15 | 57.25 |
| WD | Katinka Anna Zsembery | Hungary | withdrew | 7 | 48.67 | withdrew from competition | |

=== Pairs ===
Pairs' results
| Rank | Team | Nation | Total points | SP | | FS | |
|---|---|---|---|---|---|---|---|
| 1st place, gold medalist(s) | Ioulia Chtchetinina; Michał Woźniak | Poland | 184.40 | 1 | 62.82 | 1 | 121.58 |

=== Ice dance ===
Ice dance results
| Rank | Team | Nation | Total points | RD | | FD | |
|---|---|---|---|---|---|---|---|
| 1st place, gold medalist(s) | Natálie Taschlerová; Filip Taschler | Czech Republic | 195.19 | 1 | 78.93 | 1 | 116.26 |
| 2nd place, silver medalist(s) | Kateřina Mrázková; Daniel Mrázek | Czech Republic | 178.79 | 4 | 66.05 | 2 | 112.74 |
| 3rd place, bronze medalist(s) | Mária Sofia Pucherová; Nikita Lysak | Slovakia | 175.47 | 2 | 68.71 | 3 | 106.76 |
| 4 | Mariia Ignateva; Danijil Szemko | Hungary | 174.50 | 3 | 67.85 | 4 | 106.65 |
| 5 | Lucy Hancock; Ilias Fourati | Hungary | 151.61 | 5 | 59.68 | 5 | 91.93 |
| 6 | Sofiia Dovhal; Wiktor Kulesza | Poland | 146.39 | 6 | 58.65 | 6 | 87.74 |
| 7 | Anastasia Polibina; Pavel Golovishnikov | Poland | 142.75 | 8 | 56.51 | 7 | 86.24 |
| 8 | Emese Csiszér; Mark Shapiro | Hungary | 134.59 | 7 | 57.00 | 8 | 77.59 |

== Junior results ==
=== Pairs ===
Pairs' results
| Rank | Team | Nation | Total points | SP | | FS | |
|---|---|---|---|---|---|---|---|
| 1st place, gold medalist(s) | Laura Hečková; Alex Války | Slovakia | 123.07 | 1 | 46.34 | 1 | 76.73 |
| 2nd place, silver medalist(s) | Johanka Žilková; Matyáš Becerra | Czech Republic | 118.54 | 2 | 42.80 | 3 | 75.74 |
| 3rd place, bronze medalist(s) | Alžběta Kvíderová; Jindřich Klement | Czech Republic | 116.05 | 4 | 39.92 | 2 | 76.13 |
| WD | Debora Anna Cohen; Lukáš Vochozka | Czech Republic | withdrew | 3 | 40.64 | withdrew from competition | |

=== Ice dance ===
Ice dance results
| Rank | Team | Nation | Total points | RD | | FD | |
|---|---|---|---|---|---|---|---|
| 1st place, gold medalist(s) | Aneta Václavíková; Ivan Morozov | Slovakia | 149.87 | 1 | 59.15 | 1 | 90.72 |
| 2nd place, silver medalist(s) | Eliška Žáková; Filip Mencl | Czech Republic | 139.93 | 2 | 54.34 | 2 | 85.59 |
| 3rd place, bronze medalist(s) | Lucia Štefanovová; Jacopo Boeris | Slovakia | 129.34 | 3 | 52.76 | 3 | 76.58 |
| 4 | Natálie Blaasová; Filip Blaas | Czech Republic | 124.77 | 5 | 49.53 | 4 | 75.24 |
| 5 | Diane Sznajder; Jáchym Novák | Czech Republic | 123.58 | 4 | 50.32 | 6 | 73.26 |
| 6 | Kristýna Štanclová; Karel Kostroň | Czech Republic | 121.65 | 6 | 46.50 | 5 | 75.15 |
| 7 | Barbora Klesalová; Matěj Klesal | Czech Republic | 108.90 | 7 | 38.19 | 7 | 70.71 |
| 8 | Klára Vlčková; Tomáš Vlček | Czech Republic | 98.40 | 8 | 37.98 | 8 | 60.42 |
| 9 | Villö Szilágyi; Istvan Jaracs | Hungary | 95.39 | 9 | 37.60 | 9 | 57.79 |
| 10 | Marina Belovodjaninová; Aleksandr Tokarev | Czech Republic | 84.55 | 10 | 34.51 | 10 | 50.04 |
