= 2022 Four Nationals Figure Skating Championships =

Figure skating competition

- Type: National championship
- Date: 16 – 18 December 2021
- Season: 2021-22
- Location: Spišská Nová Ves, Slovakia
- Host: Slovak Figure Skating Association
- Venue: Spišská Nová Ves Ice Rink

Champions
- Men's singles: (Czech Republic) Matyáš Bělohradský (Hungary) András Csernoch (Poland) Vladimir Samoliv (Slovakia) Adam Hagara
- Women's singles: (Czech Republic) Eliška Březinová (Hungary) Julia Lang (Poland) Ekaterina Kurakova (Slovakia) Ema Doboszová
- Pairs: (Hungary) Ioulia Chtchetinina / Márk Magyar (Poland) Anna Hernik / Michal Wozniak
- Ice dance: (Czech Republic) Mária Sofia Pucherová / Nikita Lysak (Hungary) Mariia Ignateva / Danijil Szemko (Poland) Natalia Kaliszek / Maksym Spodyriev (Slovakia) Natálie Taschlerová / Filip Taschler
- Previous: 2021 Four National Championships; 2021 Hungarian Championships
- Next: 2023 Four National Championships

The 2022 Four Nationals Figure Skating Championships were held from 16 to 18 December 2021 in Spišská Nová Ves, Slovakia. It served as the national championships for the Czech Republic, Hungary, Poland, and Slovakia. The three highest-placing skaters from each country formed their national podiums, after the competition results were split. Medals were awarded in men's singles, women's singles, pair skating, and ice dance on the senior and junior level. The results were among the criteria used by each national federation to determine international assignments.

== Medals summary ==
=== Senior ===
| Nation | Discipline | Gold | Silver | Bronze |
|---|---|---|---|---|
| Czech Republic | Men | Matyáš Bělohradský | Georgii Reshtenko | No other competitors |
| Czech Republic | Women | Eliška Březinová | Nikola Rychtaříková | Ellen Slavickova |
| Czech Republic | Pairs | No competitors | | |
| Czech Republic | Ice dance | Natálie Taschlerová / Filip Taschler | No competitors | |
| Hungary | Men | András Csernoch | Aleksandr Vlasenko | Mozes Jozsef Berei |
| Hungary | Women | Julia Lang | Regina Schermann | Bernadett Szigeti |
| Hungary | Pairs | Ioulia Chtchetinina / Márk Magyar | Balázs Nagy / Maria Pavlova | No other competitors |
| Hungary | Ice dance | Mariia Ignateva / Danijil Szemko | No competitors | |
| Poland | Men | Vladimir Samoilov | Kornel Witkowski | Miłosz Witkowski |
| Poland | Women | Ekaterina Kurakova | Elżbieta Gabryszak | Agnieszka Rejment |
| Poland | Pairs | Anna Hernik / Michal Wozniak | No competitors | |
| Poland | Ice dance | Natalia Kaliszek / Maksym Spodyriev | Anastasia Polibina / Pavlo Golovishnikov | Jenna Hertenstein / Damian Binkowski |
| Slovakia | Men | Adam Hagara | Michael Neuman | No other competitors |
| Slovakia | Women | Ema Doboszová | Alexandra Michaela Filcova | No other competitors |
| Slovakia | Pairs | No competitors | | |
| Slovakia | Ice dance | Maria Sofia Pucherova / Nikita Lysak | No other competitors | |

=== Junior ===
| Nation | Discipline | Gold | Silver | Bronze |
|---|---|---|---|---|
| Czech Republic | Pairs | Barbora Kucianova / Lukas Vochozka | No other competitors | |
| Czech Republic | Ice dance | Denisa Cimlová / Vilém Hlavsa | Katerina Mrazkova / Daniel Mrazek | Eliska Zakova / Filip Mencl |
| Hungary | Pairs | No competitors | | |
| Hungary | Ice dance | Reka Leveles / Balazs Leveles | Petra Zita Csikos / Patrik Csikos | No other competitors |
| Poland | Pairs | No competitors | | |
| Poland | Ice dance | No competitors | | |
| Slovakia | Pairs | Margareta Muskova / Oliver Kubacak | No competitors | |
| Slovakia | Ice dance | Anna Simova / Kirill Aksenov | No competitors | |

== Senior results ==
=== Men ===
| Rank | Name | Nation | Total points | SP | | FS | |
|---|---|---|---|---|---|---|---|
| 1 | Matyáš Bělohradský | Czech Republic | 198.25 | 2 | 65.02 | 1 | 133.23 |
| 2 | Georgii Reshtenko | Czech Republic | 189.97 | 1 | 71.89 | 3 | 118.08 |
| 3 | Vladimir Samoilov | Poland | 187.54 | 4 | 58.39 | 2 | 129.15 |
| 4 | Adam Hagara | Slovakia | 180.91 | 3 | 62.89 | 4 | 118.02 |
| 5 | Kornel Witkowski | Poland | 169.13 | 6 | 54.51 | 5 | 114.62 |
| 6 | András Csernoch | Hungary | 167.48 | 7 | 53.12 | 6 | 114.36 |
| 7 | Milosz Witkowski | Poland | 175.45 | 5 | 58.02 | 8 | 108.58 |
| 8 | Aleksandr Vlasenko | Hungary | 160.98 | 9 | 51.04 | 7 | 109.94 |
| 9 | Michael Neuman | Slovakia | 158.04 | 8 | 51.31 | 9 | 103.49 |
| 10 | Jakub Lofek | Poland | 147.21 | 11 | 47.22 | 10 | 99.99 |
| 11 | András Csernoch | Hungary | 137.05 | 10 | 49.36 | 11 | 87.69 |

=== Women ===
| Rank | Name | Nation | Total points | SP | | FS | |
|---|---|---|---|---|---|---|---|
| 1 | Ekaterina Kurakova | Poland | 190.06 | 2 | 59.32 | 1 | 130.74 |
| 2 | Eliška Březinová | Czech Republic | 168.83 | 3 | 58.56 | 3 | 110.27 |
| 3 | Julia Lang | Hungary | 168.07 | 5 | 54.86 | 2 | 113.21 |
| 4 | Regina Schermann | Hungary | 156.68 | 1 | 59.78 | 6 | 96.90 |
| 5 | Ema Doboszová | Slovakia | 153.78 | 6 | 53.08 | 4 | 100.70 |
| 6 | Alexandra Michaela Filcova | Slovakia | 153.47 | 4 | 57.24 | 7 | 96.23 |
| 7 | Nikola Rychtaříková | Czech Republic | 150.85 | 7 | 51.35 | 5 | 99.50 |
| 8 | Ellen Slavickova | Czech Republic | 136.99 | 13 | 44.34 | 8 | 92.65 |
| 9 | Bernadett Szigeti | Hungary | 133.41 | 8 | 51.11 | 11 | 82.30 |
| 10 | Michaela Vrastakova | Czech Republic | 130.05 | 10 | 47.43 | 10 | 82.62 |
| 11 | Daria Zsirnov | Hungary | 129.19 | 9 | 48.33 | 13 | 80.86 |
| 12 | Lili Krizsanovszki | Hungary | 128.28 | 11 | 47.19 | 12 | 81.09 |
| 13 | Elżbieta Gabryszak | Poland | 124.22 | 16 | 40.09 | 9 | 84.13 |
| 14 | Agnieszka Rejment | Poland | 121.30 | 12 | 45.48 | 16 | 75.82 |
| 15 | Karolina Bialas | Poland | 117.91 | 17 | 38.50 | 14 | 79.41 |
| 16 | Natalia Lerka | Poland | 117.16 | 15 | 40.24 | 15 | 76.92 |
| 17 | Olusa Gajdosova | Czech Republic | 116.16 | 14 | 40.69 | 17 | 75.47 |
| 18 | Karolina Smolova | Czech Republic | 86.15 | 18 | 30.06 | 18 | 56.09 |

=== Pairs ===
| Rank | Name | Nation | Total points | SP | | FS | |
|---|---|---|---|---|---|---|---|
| 1 | Ioulia Chtchetinina / Márk Magyar | Hungary | 170.51 | 1 | 56.81 | 1 | 113.70 |
| 2 | Maria Pavlova / Balázs Nagy | Hungary | 156.93 | 2 | 55.34 | 2 | 101.59 |
| 3 | Anna Hernik / Michal Wozniak | Poland | 121.38 | 3 | 42.53 | 3 | 78.85 |
| WD | Jelizaveta Žuková / Martin Bidař | Czech Republic | withdrew | withdrew from competition | | | |

=== Ice dance ===
| Rank | Name | Nation | Total points | RD | | FD | |
|---|---|---|---|---|---|---|---|
| 1 | Natalia Kaliszek / Maksym Spodyriev | Poland | 181.09 | 1 | 74.98 | 2 | 106.11 |
| 2 | Natálie Taschlerová / Filip Taschler | Czech Republic | 179.95 | 2 | 73.27 | 1 | 106.68 |
| 3 | Mariia Ignateva / Danijil Szemko | Hungary | 168.23 | 3 | 69.79 | 3 | 98.44 |
| 4 | Mária Sofia Pucherová / Nikita Lysak | Slovakia | 150.03 | 4 | 63.61 | 5 | 86.70 |
| 5 | Anastasia Polibina / Pavel Golovishnikov | Poland | 147.25 | 5 | 60.55 | 4 | 86.42 |
| 6 | Jenna Hertenstein / Damian Binkowski | Poland | 134.10 | 6 | 54.33 | 6 | 79.77 |
| 7 | Arina Klimova / Filip Bojanowski | Poland | 128.37 | 7 | 49.04 | 7 | 76.84 |

== Junior results ==
=== Pairs ===
| Rank | Name | Nation | Total points | SP | | FS | |
|---|---|---|---|---|---|---|---|
| 1 | Barbora Kucianová / Lukas Vochozka | Czech Republic | 125.68 | 1 | 44.83 | 1 | 80.85 |
| 2 | Margaréta Mušková / Oliver Kubačák | Slovakia | 102.80 | 2 | 33.03 | 2 | 69.77 |

=== Ice dance ===
| Rank | Name | Nation | Total points | RD | | FD | |
|---|---|---|---|---|---|---|---|
| 1 | Denisa Cimlová / Vilém Hlavsa | Czech Republic | 152.96 | 1 | 60.03 | 1 | 92.93 |
| 2 | Kateřina Mrázková / Daniel Mrázek | Czech Republic | 144.40 | 3 | 52.20 | 2 | 92.20 |
| 3 | Anna Simova / Kirill Aksenov | Slovakia | 140.06 | 2 | 55.75 | 3 | 84.31 |
| 4 | Reka Leveles / Balazs Leveles | Hungary | 110.44 | 4 | 43.50 | 4 | 66.94 |
| 5 | Petra Zita Csikos / Patrik Csikos | Hungary | 99.01 | 6 | 39.30 | 5 | 59.71 |
| 6 | Eliska Zakova / Filip Mencl | Czech Republic | 95.90 | 5 | 41.66 | 6 | 54.24 |
