= 2023 Four Nationals Figure Skating Championships =

Figure skating competition

- Type: National championships
- Date: December 15 – 17, 2022
- Season: 2022–23
- Location: Budapest, Hungary
- Host: Hungarian National Skating Federation
- Previous: 2022 Four Nationals Championships
- Next: 2024 Four Nationals Championships

The 2023 Four Nationals Figure Skating Championships included the Czech Republic, Slovakia, Poland, and Hungary. It took place on December 15–17, 2022 in Budapest, Hungary. The results were split by country; the three highest-placing skaters from each country formed their national podiums in men's singles, ladies' singles, pair skating, and ice dancing. The results were among the criteria used to determine international assignments.

== Entries ==
Country	Men	Women	Pairs	Ice dance
Czech Republic	Petr Kotlařík; Georgii Reshtenko	Karolína Baťková; Eliška Březinová; Lucie Datlová; Nikola Rychtaříková; Barbora Vránková; Michaela Vrašťáková	Federica Simioli / Alessandro Zarbo	Denisa Cimlová / Joti Polizoakis; Natálie Taschlerová / Filip Taschler
Hungary	Mózes József Berei; Aleksandr Vlasenko; Aleksei Vlasenko	Lili Krizsanovszki; Júlia Láng; Katinka Anna Zsembery; Dária Zsirnov	Mária Pavlova / Alexei Sviatchenko	Lucy Hancock / Ilias Fourati; Mariia Ignateva / Danijil Szemko
Poland	Jakub Lofek; Vladimir Samoilov; Kornel Witkowski; Miłosz Witkowski	Karolina Białas; Zofia Grzegorzewska; Ekaterina Kurakova; Laura Szczęsna		Olexandra Borysova / Aaron Freeman; Olivia Oliver / Elliot Graham; Anastasia Polibina / Pavel Golovishnikov
Slovakia	Adam Hagara	Ema Doboszová; Alexandra Michaela Filcová; Vanesa Šelmeková		Mária Sofia Pucherová / Nikita Lysak; Anna Simova / Kirill Aksenov

== Medals summary ==
=== Czech Republic ===
Discipline	Gold	Silver	Bronze
Men	Petr Kotlařík	Georgii Reshtenko	—
Ladies	Barbora Vránková	Eliška Březinová	Nikola Rychtaříková
Pairs	Federica Simioli / Alessandro Zabro	—	
Ice dancing	Natálie Taschlerová / Filip Taschler	Denisa Cimlová / Joti Polizoakis	—

=== Hungary ===
Discipline	Gold	Silver	Bronze
Men	Aleksandr Vlasenko	Mózes József Berei	Aleksei Vlasenko
Ladies	Júlia Láng	Katinka Anna Zsembery	Lili Krizsanovszki
Pairs	Mária Pavlova / Aleksei Sviatchenko	—	
Ice dancing	Mariia Ignateva / Danijil Szemko	Lucy Hancock / Ilias Fourati	—

=== Poland ===
Discipline	Gold	Silver	Bronze
Men	Vladimir Samoilov	Miłosz Witkowski	Kornel Witkowski
Ladies	Ekaterina Kurakova	Karolina Białas	Zofia Grzegorzewska
Ice dancing	Anastasia Polibina / Pavel Golovishnikov	Olivia Oliver / Elliot Graham	Olexandra Borysova / Aaron Freeman

=== Slovakia ===
Discipline	Gold	Silver	Bronze
Men	Adam Hagara	—	
Ladies	Alexandra Michaela Filcová	Ema Doboszová	Vanesa Šelmeková
Ice dancing	Anna Simova / Kirill Aksenov	Mária Sofia Pucherová / Nikita Lysak	—

== Senior results ==
=== Men ===
Rank	Name	Nation	Total points	SP		FS	
1	Vladimir Samoilov	Poland	223.43	1	87.27	2	136.16
2	Adam Hagara	Slovakia	205.02	2	67.99	1	137.03
3	Miłosz Witkowski	Poland	182.04	6	60.82	3	121.22
4	Petr Kotlařík	Czech Republic	181.80	3	65.82	6	115.98
5	Aleksandr Vlasenko	Hungary	177.66	5	61.50	5	116.16
6	Kornel Witkowski	Poland	175.97	9	56.19	4	119.78
7	Georgii Reshtenko	Czech Republic	168.22	8	57.74	7	110.48
8	Mózes József Berei	Hungary	161.71	4	63.11	8	98.60
9	Jakub Lofek	Poland	156.06	7	58.58	9	97.48
10	Aleksei Vlasenko	Hungary	151.88	10	55.68	10	96.20

=== Ladies ===
Rank	Name	Nation	Total points	SP		FS	
1	Ekaterina Kurakova	Poland	185.14	1	63.01	1	122.13
2	Barbora Vránková	Czech Republic	163.65	6	49.30	2	114.35
3	Júlia Láng	Hungary	163.21	3	51.04	3	112.17
4	Eliška Březinová	Czech Republic	152.41	7	48.74	4	103.67
5	Karolina Białas	Poland	141.19	5	49.60	5	91.59
6	Alexandra Michaela Filcová	Slovakia	140.60	4	50.33	7	90.27
7	Katinka Anna Zsembery	Hungary	139.46	2	52.20	9	87.26
8	Ema Doboszová	Slovakia	134.72	10	44.00	6	90.72
9	Nikola Rychtaříková	Czech Republic	133.34	9	45.24	8	88.10
10	Lili Krizsanovszki	Hungary	132.42	8	46.95	10	85.47
11	Vanesa Šelmeková	Slovakia	123.73	12	42.03	11	81.70
12	Dária Zsirnov	Hungary	117.65	13	41.22	12	76.43
13	Zofia Grzegorzewska	Poland	117.24	11	42.69	15	74.55
14	Michaela Vrašťáková	Czech Republic	114.79	15	39.75	14	75.04
15	Lucie Datlová	Czech Republic	114.59	17	38.19	13	76.40
16	Karolína Baťková	Czech Republic	111.89	16	38.58	16	73.31
17	Laura Szczęsna	Poland	105.42	14	39.76	17	65.66

=== Pairs ===
Rank	Name	Nation	Total points	SP		FS	
1	Mária Pavlova / Aleksei Sviatchenko	Hungary	173.85	1	61.84	1	112.01
2	Federica Simioli / Alessandro Zabro	Czech Republic	144.02	2	51.72	2	92.30

=== Ice dance ===
Rank	Name	Nation	Total points	RD		FD	
1	Natálie Taschlerová / Filip Taschler	Czech Republic	192.76	1	77.92	1	114.84
2	Mariia Ignateva / Danijil Szemko	Hungary	171.05	2	67.07	2	103.98
3	Anastasia Polibina / Pavel Golovishnikov	Poland	162.11	4	63.87	3	98.24
4	Olivia Oliver / Elliot Graham	Poland	159.04	3	63.92	4	95.12
5	Anna Simova / Kirill Aksenov	Slovakia	150.79	6	61.63	5	89.16
6	Denisa Cimlová / Joti Polizoakis	Czech Republic	149.25	5	62.77	6	86.48
7	Lucy Hancock / Ilias Fourati	Hungary	142.22	7	57.84	7	84.38
8	Mária Sofia Pucherová / Nikita Lysak	Slovakia	135.64	8	55.49	8	80.15
9	Olexandra Borysova / Aaron Freeman	Poland	130.49	9	51.35	9	79.14

== Junior results ==
=== Pairs ===
Rank	Name	Nation	Total points	SP		FS	
1	Barbora Kucianova / Lukas Vochozka	Czech Republic	137.58	1	47.33	1	90.25
2	Nikola Sitková / Oliver Kubacák	Slovakia	100.16	2	37.88	2	62.28

=== Ice Dance ===
Rank	Name	Nation	Total points	RD		FD	
1	Kateřina Mrázková / Daniel Mrázek	Czech Republic	173.09	1	69.89	1	103.20
2	Sofiia Dovhal / Wiktor Kulesza	Poland	139.47	2	56.34	2	83.13
3	Natalie Blaasová / Filip Blaass	Czech Republic	129.95	3	52.20	3	77.75
4	Andrea Pšurná / Jachym Novák	Czech Republic	116.73	4	44.82	4	71.91
5	Eliška Žáková / Filip Mencl	Czech Republic	109.90	6	41.49	5	68.41
6	Maya Benkiewicz / Mark Shapiro	Hungary	109.02	5	41.96	6	67.06

=== Czech Republic Juniors ===
Discipline	Gold	Silver	Bronze
Pairs	Barbora Kucianova / Lukas Vochozka	—	
Ice dancing	Kateřina Mrázková / Daniel Mrázek	Natalie Blaasová / Filip Blaass	Andrea Pšurná / Jachym Novák

=== Hungary Juniors ===
Discipline	Gold	Silver	Bronze
Ice dancing	Maya Benkiewicz / Mark Shapiro	—	

=== Poland Juniors ===
Discipline	Gold	Silver	Bronze
Ice dancing	Sofiia Dovhal / Wiktor Kulesza	—	

=== Slovakia Juniors ===
Discipline	Gold	Silver	Bronze
Pairs	Nikola Sitková / Oliver Kubacák	—	
