= 2026 CS Tallinn Trophy =

Figure skating competition

2026 Tallinn Trophy
- Type: ISU Challenger Series
- Date: 16 – 22 November 2026
- Season: 2026–27
- Location: Tallinn, Estonia
- Host: Estonian Skating Union
- Venue: Tondiraba Ice Hall

Champions
- Men's singles: (Italy) Gabriele Frangipani
- Women's singles: (Italy) Lara Naki Gutmann
- Pairs: (United States) Linzy Fitzpatrick / Keyton Bearinger
- Ice dance: (Australia) Holly Harris / Jason Chan
- Previous: 2025 Tallinn Trophy
- Previous CS: 2026 Budapest Trophy
- Next CS: 2026 Warsaw Cup

The 2026 Tallinn Trophy was a figure skating competition sanctioned by the International Skating Union (ISU), organized and hosted by the Estonian Skating Union, and the tenth event of the 2026–27 ISU Challenger Series. It was held at the Tondiraba Ice Hall in Tallinn, Estonia, from 16 to 22 November 2026. Medals were awarded in men's singles, women's singles, pair skating, and ice dance, and skaters earned ISU World Standing points based on their results. Gabriele Frangipani of Italy won the men's event, Lara Naki Gutmann of Italy won the women's event, Linzy Fitzpatrick and Keyton Bearinger of the United States won the pairs event, and Holly Harris and Jason Chan of Australia won the ice dance event.

== Background ==
The Tallinn Trophy debuted in 2002 as a regional competition, and became an international competition in 2011. The ISU Challenger Series was introduced in 2014. It is a series of international figure skating competitions sanctioned by the ISU and organized by ISU member nations. Its objective is to ensure consistent organization and structure within a series of linked international competitions, providing opportunities for senior-level skaters to compete at the international level and to earn ISU World Standing points. The Tallinn Trophy was a Challenger Series event from 2015 through 2018, and again from 2024 onward. Due to the COVID-19 pandemic, the 2020 Tallinn Trophy was held exclusively for skaters in Estonia.

The 2026–27 Challenger Series consists of thirteen events, of which the Tallinn Trophy is the tenth. Skaters and teams are limited to three Challenger Series events per season. At the end of the series, the two highest final scores from up to three different Challenger Series events are combined to form the Challenger Series ranking, and the top three skaters or teams in each discipline receive ISU prize money. International junior-level competitions in all four disciplines, which are not part of the Challenger Series, were held alongside the senior events.

== Entries ==
The International Skating Union published the list of entrants following the 16 October 2026 entry deadline.

Entries
Country	Men	Women	Pairs	Ice dance
Argentina	—N/a	Michelle DiCicco	—N/a	—N/a
Australia	Douglas Gerber	Haruna Murakami	—N/a	Holly Harris; Jason Chan
Austria	Maksym Petrychenko	Flora Marie Schaller	—N/a	—N/a
Brazil	—N/a	—N/a	—N/a	Natalia Pallu-Neves; Jayin Panesar
Bulgaria	Larry Loupolover	—N/a	—N/a	—N/a
Canada	Anthony Paradis	Breken Brezden	Miyu Yunoki; Tristan Taylor	Alicia Fabbri; Marko Jevgeni Gaidajenko
Canada	Anthony Paradis	Gabrielle Daleman	Miyu Yunoki; Tristan Taylor	Sandrine Gauthier; Paul Ayer
China	—N/a	—N/a	Liu Xuanyu; Han Wenbao	—N/a
Chinese Taipei	Li Yu-hsiang	Tsai Yu-feng	—N/a	—N/a
Czech Republic	—N/a	Nela Šnebergerová	Debora Anna Cohen; Lukáš Vochozka	—N/a
Czech Republic	—N/a	Barbora Vránková	Debora Anna Cohen; Lukáš Vochozka	—N/a
Estonia	—N/a	Maria Eliise Kaljuvere	—N/a	—N/a
Estonia	—N/a	Olesja Leonova	—N/a	—N/a
Estonia	—N/a	Kristina Lisovskaja	—N/a	—N/a
Estonia	—N/a	Marta Helena Prangel	—N/a	—N/a
Estonia	—N/a	Karoliine Raudsepp	—N/a	—N/a
Finland	Makar Suntsev	Lotta Artimo	—N/a	Daniela Ivanitskiy; Matthew Sperry
Finland	Makar Suntsev	Minja Peltonen	—N/a	Daniela Ivanitskiy; Matthew Sperry
Finland	Makar Suntsev	Selma Välitalo	—N/a	Daniela Ivanitskiy; Matthew Sperry
France	François Pitot	—N/a	Megan Wessenberg; Denys Strekalin	Louise Bordet; Martin Chardain
France	Ian Vauclin	—N/a	Megan Wessenberg; Denys Strekalin	Celina Fradji; Jean-Hans Fourneaux
France	Xavier Vauclin	—N/a	Megan Wessenberg; Denys Strekalin	Alisa Ovsiankina; Maximilien Rahier
Germany	—N/a	—N/a	Julia Grabowski; Lukas Gneiding	Karla Maria Karl; Kai Hoferichter
Great Britain	—N/a	Genevieve Somerville	—N/a	Lilah Fear; Lewis Gibson
Greece	—N/a	Lucrezia Gennaro	—N/a	Olympia Kalaganis; Emile Deveau
Hungary	—N/a	—N/a	—N/a	Mariia Ignateva; Danijil Szemko
Italy	Corey Circelli	Lara Naki Gutmann	Irina Napolitano; Edoardo Comi	Carolina Portesi Peroni; Pietro Papetti
Italy	Gabriele Frangipani	Sarina Joos	Irina Napolitano; Edoardo Comi	Carolina Portesi Peroni; Pietro Papetti
Italy	Matteo Nalbone	Marina Piredda	Irina Napolitano; Edoardo Comi	Carolina Portesi Peroni; Pietro Papetti
Kazakhstan	Nikita Krivosheyev	Nuriya Suleimen	—N/a	—N/a
Kazakhstan	Artur Smagulov	Nuriya Suleimen	—N/a	—N/a
Kyrgyzstan	—N/a	Zhasmin Shlaga	—N/a	—N/a
Latvia	—N/a	Nikola Fomchenkova	—N/a	—N/a
Latvia	—N/a	Anastasija Konga	—N/a	—N/a
Latvia	—N/a	Emilija Ozola	—N/a	—N/a
Lithuania	—N/a	Uma Zagele	—N/a	—N/a
Malaysia	Fang Ze Zeng	Afrina Diyanah	—N/a	—N/a
Netherlands	—N/a	—N/a	—N/a	Chelsea Verhaegh; Sherim van Geffen
Norway	—N/a	Mia Risa Gomez	—N/a	—N/a
Norway	—N/a	Pernille With	—N/a	—N/a
Poland	Jakub Lofek	Marietta Atkins	—N/a	Xuantong Li; Filip Bojanowski
Poland	Vladimir Samoilov	Karolina Białas	—N/a	Xuantong Li; Filip Bojanowski
Portugal	David Gouveia	—N/a	—N/a	—N/a
Slovakia	Lukáš Václavík	—N/a	—N/a	—N/a
South Korea	Kim Hyun-gyeom	—N/a	—N/a	—N/a
Spain	Euken Alberdi	—N/a	—N/a	—N/a
Spain	Adrián Jiménez de Baldomero	—N/a	—N/a	—N/a
Sweden	Hugo Bostedt	Josefin Brovall	—N/a	—N/a
Sweden	Elias Sayed	Julia Brovall	—N/a	—N/a
Sweden	Elias Sayed	Anita Östlund	—N/a	—N/a
Switzerland	Noah Bodenstein	Sara Franzi	—N/a	Arianna Sassi; Luca Morini
Switzerland	Noah Bodenstein	Livia Kaiser	—N/a	Arianna Sassi; Luca Morini
Switzerland	Noah Bodenstein	Eugenia Sekulovski	—N/a	Arianna Sassi; Luca Morini
Ukraine	—N/a	—N/a	—N/a	Zoe Larson; Andrii Kapran
United States	Jimmy Ma	—N/a	Linzy Fitzpatrick; Keyton Bearinger	Amy Cui; Jonathan Rogers
United States	Liam Kapeikis	—N/a	Olivia Flores; Mark Sadusky	Elliana Peal; Ethan Peal
United States	—N/a	—N/a	Reagan Moss; Jakub Galbavy	Elliana Peal; Ethan Peal

=== Changes to preliminary entries ===
Discipline	Withdrew		Added		Notes	Ref.
Discipline	Date	Skater(s)	Date	Skater(s)	Notes	Ref.
Men	17 November 2026	(Austria) Maksym Petrychenko	—N/a			
Men	17 November 2026	(Italy) Corey Circelli	—N/a			
Men	17 November 2026	(United States) Liam Kapeikis	—N/a			
Women	17 November 2026	(Finland) Minja Peltonen	—N/a			
Women	17 November 2026	(United Kingdom) Genevieve Somerville	—N/a			
Women	17 November 2026	(Greece) Lucrezia Gennaro	—N/a			
Women	17 November 2026	(Italy) Marina Piredda	—N/a			
Women	17 November 2026	(Kazakhstan) Nuriya Suleimen	—N/a			
Women	17 November 2026	(Lithuania) Uma Zagele	—N/a			
Women	17 November 2026	(Poland) Marietta Atkins	—N/a			
Women	—N/a		17 November 2026	(Finland) Oona Ounasvuori		
Women	—N/a		17 November 2026	(Italy) Carlotta Maria Gardini		
Pairs	17 November 2026	(Germany) Julia Grabowski / Lukas Gneiding	—N/a			
Pairs	18 November 2026	(France) Megan Wessenberg / Denys Strekalin	—N/a		Assigned to the 2026 Finlandia Trophy from the Grand Prix alternates list	
Ice dance	17 November 2026	(Germany) Karla Maria Karl / Kai Hoferichter	—N/a			
Ice dance	17 November 2026	(United Kingdom) Lilah Fear / Lewis Gibson	—N/a			
Ice dance	17 November 2026	(Poland) Xuantong Li / Filip Bojanowski	—N/a			
Ice dance	17 November 2026	(Ukraine) Zoe Larson / Andrii Kapran	—N/a			

== Required performance elements ==
=== Single skating ===
Men competing in single skating perform their short programs on 18 November, while women perform theirs on 19 November. Lasting no more than 2 minutes 40 seconds, the short program has to include the following elements:

For men: one double or triple Axel; one triple or quadruple jump; one jump combination consisting of a double jump and a triple jump, two triple jumps, or a quadruple jump and a double jump or triple jump; one flying spin; one camel spin or sit spin with a change of foot; one spin combination with a change of foot; and one step sequence using the full ice surface.

For women: one double or triple Axel; one triple jump; one jump combination consisting of a double jump and a triple jump, or two triple jumps; one flying spin; one layback spin, sideways leaning spin, camel spin, or sit spin without a change of foot; one spin combination with a change of foot; and one step sequence using the full ice surface.

Men perform their free skates on 19 November, while women perform theirs on 20 November. The free skate can last no more than 4 minutes, and has to include the following: six jump elements, of which one has to be an Axel-type jump; three spins, of which one has to be a spin combination, one a flying spin, and one a choreographic spin; one step sequence; and a choreographic sequence.

=== Pair skating ===
Couples competing in pair skating first perform their short programs on 19 November. Lasting no more than 2 minutes 40 seconds, the short program has to include the following elements: one pair lift, one double or triple twist lift, one double or triple throw jump, one double or triple solo jump, one pair spin combination, one death spiral, and one step sequence using the full ice surface.

Couples then perform their free skates on 20 November. The free skate can last no more than 4 minutes, and has to include the following: two pair lifts, one twist lift, two different throw jumps, one solo jump, one jump combination or sequence, one choreographic pair spin, one choreographic pair lift, and one death spiral.

=== Ice dance ===
Couples competing in ice dance first perform their rhythm dances on 21 November. The rhythm dance can last no more than 2 minutes 50 seconds, and the theme this season is "Rhythm and Waltz". The rhythm dance has to include the following elements: one section of the Golden Waltz pattern dance, one creative dance element, one dance lift, one set of sequential twizzles, and one step sequence while not touching.

Couples then perform their free dances on 22 November. The free dance can last no longer than 4 minutes, and has to include the following: three dance lifts, or one short lift and one combination lift; one dance spin; one step sequence in hold; one set of synchronized twizzles; one one-foot turns sequence in hold; and two choreographic elements.

== Judging ==
Skaters are judged according to the required technical elements of their program (such as jumps and spins), as well as the overall presentation of their program, based on three program components (skating skills, presentation, and composition). Each technical element in a figure skating performance is assigned a predetermined base point value and scored by a panel of nine judges on a scale from −5 to +5 based on the quality of its execution. Each Grade of Execution (GOE) from −5 to +5 is assigned a value as indicated on the Scale of Values. For example, a triple Axel is worth a base value of 8.00 points, and a GOE of +3 is worth 2.40 points, so a triple Axel with a GOE of +3 earns 10.40 points. The judging panel's GOE for each element is determined by calculating the trimmed mean (the average after discarding the highest and lowest scores). The panel's scores for all elements are added together to generate a Total Elements Score. At the same time, the judges evaluate each performance based on the three aforementioned program components and assign each a score from 0.25 to 10 in 0.25-point increments. The judging panel's final score for each program component is also determined by calculating the trimmed mean. Those scores are then multiplied by the factor shown on the chart below; the results are added together to generate a total Program Component Score.

Program component factoring
Discipline	Short program or rhythm dance	Free skate or free dance
Men	1.67	3.33
Women	1.33	2.67
Pairs	1.33	2.67
Ice dance	1.33	2.00

Deductions are applied for certain violations, such as time infractions, stops and restarts, or falls. The Total Elements Score and Program Component Score are then added together, minus any deductions, to generate a final performance score for each skater or team.

== Medal summary ==
Medalists
Discipline	Gold	Silver	Bronze
Men	(Italy) Gabriele Frangipani	(Canada) Anthony Paradis	(South Korea) Kim Hyun-gyeom
Women	(Italy) Lara Naki Gutmann	(Estonia) Maria Eliise Kaljuvere	(Canada) Breken Brezden
Pairs	(United States) Linzy Fitzpatrick / Keyton Bearinger	(Canada) Miyu Yunoki / Tristan Taylor	(United States) Reagan Moss / Jakub Galbavy
Ice dance	(Australia) Holly Harris / Jason Chan	(Canada) Alicia Fabbri / Marko Jevgeni Gaidajenko	(United States) Amy Cui / Jonathan Rogers

== Results ==
=== Men's singles ===
Men's results
Rank	Skater	Nation	Total points	SP		FS	
1	Gabriele Frangipani	Italy	215.19	1	80.96	3	134.23
2	Anthony Paradis	Canada	214.33	4	72.42	1	141.91
3	Kim Hyun-gyeom	South Korea	213.24	2	79.57	4	133.67
4	Vladimir Samoilov	Poland	203.49	3	74.35	6	129.14
5	Matteo Nalbone	Italy	202.29	8	65.87	2	136.42
6	Li Yu-hsiang	Chinese Taipei	197.38	5	72.07	9	125.31
7	Makar Suntsev	Finland	194.98	6	67.98	7	127.00
8	Jakub Lofek	Poland	190.48	12	61.09	5	129.39
9	François Pitot	France	188.30	10	62.46	8	125.84
10	Xavier Vauclin	France	176.12	14	55.08	10	121.04
11	Jimmy Ma	United States	174.45	9	64.64	12	109.81
12	Lukáš Václavík	Slovakia	173.30	7	66.26	15	107.04
13	Artur Smagulov	Kazakhstan	170.60	11	61.09	13	109.51
14	Hugo Bostedt	Sweden	162.36	20	49.87	11	112.49
15	Elias Sayed	Sweden	161.74	18	52.73	14	109.01
16	Douglas Gerber	Australia	155.85	13	56.73	17	99.12
17	Fang Ze Zeng	Malaysia	151.53	17	53.76	18	97.77
18	Noah Bodenstein	Switzerland	149.82	22	43.48	16	106.34
19	David Gouveia	Portugal	139.87	16	54.35	19	85.52
20	Ian Vauclin	France	139.48	15	54.93	20	84.55
21	Adrián Jiménez de Baldomero	Spain	116.60	21	46.86	21	69.74
22	Larry Loupolover	Bulgaria	93.53	23	36.51	22	57.02
WD	Euken Alberdi	Spain	—	19	51.42	Withdrew from competition	
WD	Nikita Krivosheyev	Kazakhstan	Withdrew from competition				

=== Women's singles ===
Women's results
Rank	Skater	Nation	Total points	SP		FS	
1	Lara Naki Gutmann	Italy	204.85	1	70.25	1	134.60
2	Maria Eliise Kaljuvere	Estonia	203.25	2	69.20	2	134.05
3	Breken Brezden	Canada	179.91	5	62.00	3	117.91
4	Mia Risa Gomez	Norway	177.55	6	61.92	4	115.63
5	Sarina Joos	Italy	175.45	4	63.48	6	111.97
6	Livia Kaiser	Switzerland	174.10	3	63.87	8	110.23
7	Anita Östlund	Sweden	170.38	10	55.70	5	114.68
8	Barbora Vránková	Czech Republic	165.24	12	54.40	7	110.84
9	Carlotta Maria Gardini	Italy	163.78	7	57.94	9	105.84
10	Sara Franzi	Switzerland	157.92	11	54.42	11	103.50
11	Nikola Fomchenkova	Latvia	155.20	17	51.37	10	103.83
12	Kristina Lisovskaja	Estonia	149.43	18	49.87	14	99.56
13	Flora Marie Schaller	Austria	147.54	21	47.91	13	99.63
14	Eugenia Sekulovski	Switzerland	147.28	23	47.17	12	100.11
15	Oona Ounasvuori	Finland	145.97	8	56.34	21	89.63
16	Marta Helena Prangel	Estonia	144.94	13	53.45	19	91.49
17	Josefin Brovall	Sweden	143.77	19	49.76	17	94.01
18	Lotta Artimo	Finland	142.18	14	53.06	23	89.12
19	Selma Välitalo	Finland	141.13	9	56.32	27	84.81
20	Tsai Yu-feng	Chinese Taipei	141.11	15	51.77	22	89.34
21	Karolina Białas	Poland	140.19	25	44.54	16	95.65
22	Anastasija Konga	Latvia	140.10	20	48.20	18	91.90
23	Gabrielle Daleman	Canada	139.47	27	41.45	15	98.02
24	Nela Šnebergerová	Czech Republic	137.59	16	51.39	25	86.20
25	Pernille With	Norway	137.29	22	47.19	20	90.10
26	Zhasmin Shlaga	Kyrgyzstan	131.50	26	44.39	24	87.11
27	Julia Brovall	Sweden	128.59	24	44.62	28	83.97
28	Haruna Murakami	Australia	121.93	29	36.36	26	85.57
29	Olesja Leonova	Estonia	115.64	28	40.69	29	74.95
30	Karoliine Raudsepp	Estonia	94.85	31	30.16	30	64.69
31	Emilija Ozola	Latvia	89.32	30	34.46	31	54.86
32	Afrina Diyanah	Malaysia	79.30	32	28.00	32	51.30
33	Michelle DiCicco	Argentina	61.85	33	20.34	33	41.51

=== Pairs ===
Pairs results
Rank	Team	Nation	Total points	SP		FS	
1	Linzy Fitzpatrick; Keyton Bearinger	United States	156.27	2	53.20	1	103.07
2	Miyu Yunoki; Tristan Taylor	Canada	153.15	1	54.67	2	98.48
3	Reagan Moss; Jakub Galbavy	United States	146.95	3	52.76	3	94.19
4	Irina Napolitano; Edoardo Comi	Italy	142.73	5	50.76	4	91.97
5	Debora Anna Cohen; Lukáš Vochozka	Czech Republic	140.90	4	50.93	5	89.97
6	Olivia Flores; Mark Sadusky	United States	134.12	6	49.77	6	84.35
7	Liu Xuanyu; Han Wenbao	China	116.45	7	42.85	7	73.60

=== Ice dance ===
Ice dance results
Rank	Team	Nation	Total points	RD		FD	
1	Holly Harris; Jason Chan	Australia	185.82	1	74.17	1	111.65
2	Alicia Fabbri; Marko Jevgeni Gaidajenko	Canada	179.56	2	73.79	2	105.77
3	Amy Cui; Jonathan Rogers	United States	175.76	3	71.21	3	104.55
4	Sandrine Gauthier; Paul Ayer	Canada	169.36	4	69.31	4	100.05
5	Elliana Peal; Ethan Peal	United States	164.73	6	67.26	5	97.47
6	Carolina Portesi Peroni; Pietro Papetti	Italy	161.78	5	67.29	8	94.49
7	Celina Fradji; Jean-Hans Fourneaux	France	161.62	8	64.68	6	96.94
8	Mariia Ignateva; Danijil Szemko	Hungary	159.32	7	64.74	7	94.58
9	Louise Bordet; Martin Chardain	France	156.35	9	64.02	9	92.33
10	Chelsea Verhaegh; Sherim van Geffen	Netherlands	149.78	10	60.38	11	89.40
11	Alisa Ovsiankina; Maximilien Rahier	France	147.71	12	55.50	10	92.21
12	Natalia Pallu-Neves; Jayin Panesar	Brazil	140.03	11	56.15	12	83.88
13	Daniela Ivanitskiy; Matthew Sperry	Finland	133.38	13	53.24	13	80.14
14	Olympia Kalaganis; Emile Deveau	Greece	121.99	14	52.91	14	69.08
WD	Arianna Sassi; Luca Morini	Switzerland	Withdrew from competition				

== Works cited ==
- "Sports Rules – Single & Pair Skating and Ice Dance" (PDF). International Skating Union. Archived (PDF) from the original on 24 May 2026.
