= Anastasia Polibina =

Polish ice dancer (born 2000)

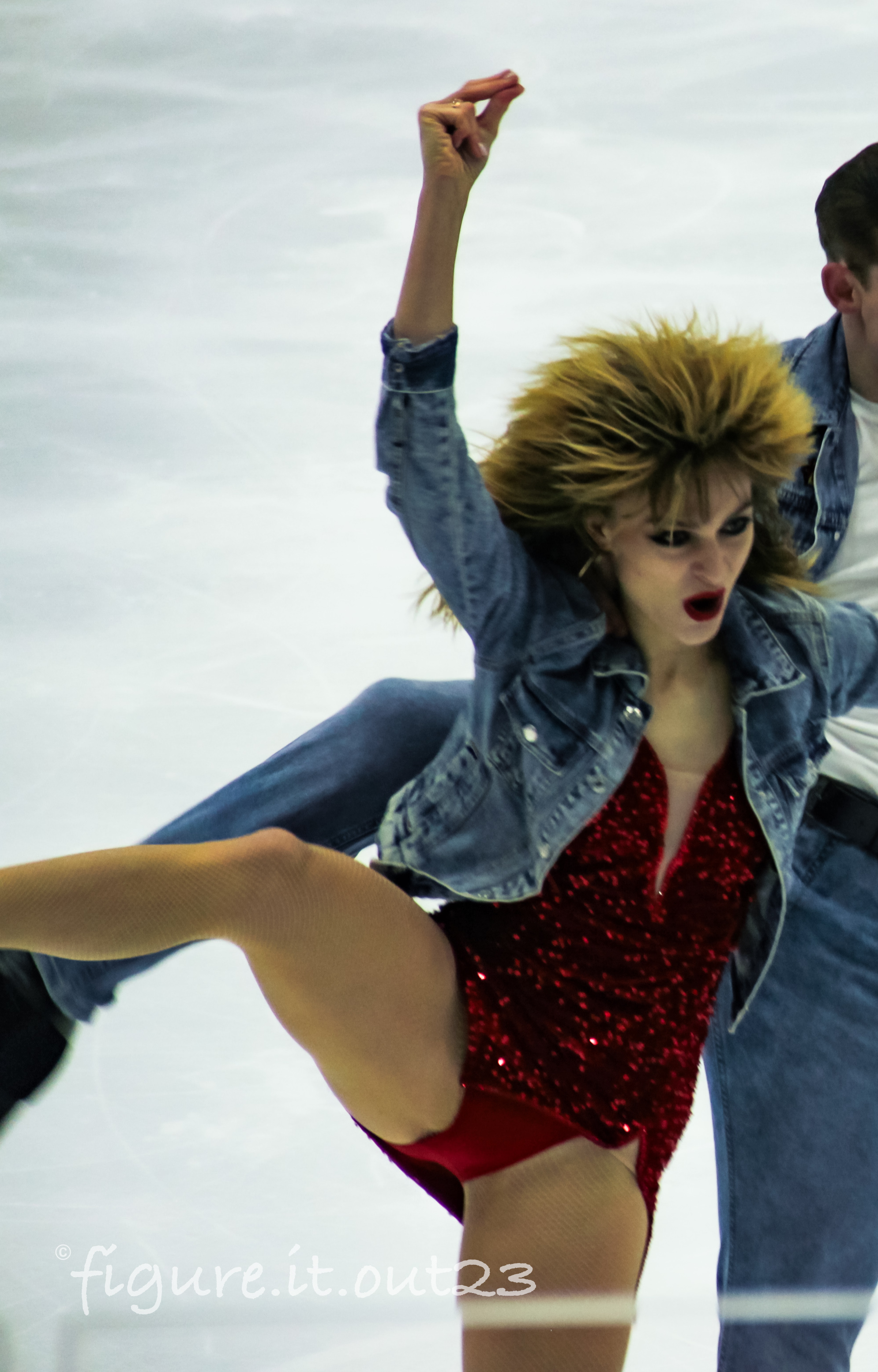
- Anastasia Polibina at a skating competition

Personal information
- Native name: Анастасия Полибина
- Born: 30 June 2000 (age 26) Moscow, Russia
- Home town: Toruń, Poland
- Height: 1.69 m (5 ft 6 1/2 in)

Figure skating career
- Country: Poland
- Discipline: Ice dance
- Partner: Pavel Golovishnikov (since 2019); Radosław Barszczak (2015–18)
- Coach: Natalia Kaliszek-Wasik; Matteo Zanni
- Skating club: MKS Axel Toruń
- Began skating: 2004

Medal record
Polish Championships
Gold medal – first place	2023 Budapest	Ice dance
Silver medal – second place	2021 Cieszyn	Ice dance
Silver medal – second place	2022 Spišská Nová Ves	Ice dance
Silver medal – second place	2025 Cieszyn	Ice dance
Bronze medal – third place	2018 Košice	Ice dance
Bronze medal – third place	2020 Ostrava	Ice dance
Bronze medal – third place	2024 Turnov	Ice dance

Anastasia Polibina (Russian: Анастасия Полибина; born 30 June 2000) is a Polish ice dancer. With her skating partner, Pavel Golovishnikov, she is the 2022 Bosphorus Cup champion, 2022 NRW Trophy silver medalist, and 2023 Polish national champion.

== Career ==
=== Early years ===
Polibina began learning to skate in 2004.

In 2015, she teamed up with Radosław Barszczak to compete for Poland in ice dancing. The two made their international debut in September, placing 17th at an ISU Junior Grand Prix event in Toruń, Poland.

=== 2017–18 season ===
Polibina/Barszczak's senior debut came in November 2017, at the Volvo Open Cup in Riga, Latvia. Later that month, they placed 12th at two ISU Challenger Series events — the 2017 CS Warsaw Cup and 2017 CS Tallinn Trophy. In December, they finished ninth at the Santa Claus Cup in Hungary, and then took bronze at the Polish Championships.

=== 2020–21 season ===
Polibina teamed up with Russian ice dancer Pavel Golovishnikov to skate for Poland. The two decided to train in Toruń under Sylwia Nowak-Trębacka. In December 2020, they became the Polish national silver medalists at the Four Nationals in Cieszyn. They had no appearances at ISU events in their first season together.

=== 2021–22 season ===
In October 2021, Polibina/Golovishnikov placed fourth at the Mezzaluna Cup in Italy and then won bronze at the Viktor Petrenko Cup in Odesa, Ukraine. In November, they finished 13th at the 2021 CS Warsaw Cup.

In December, competing at Four Nationals, they repeated as national silver medalists. They were assigned to the 2022 European Championships but withdrew before the event due to a positive test for SARS-CoV-2. They placed 28th at the 2022 World Championships, which took place in March in Montpellier, France.

=== 2022–23 season ===
In November, Polibina/Golovishnikov took silver at the NRW Trophy in Germany. In December, they won gold at the Bosphorus Cup in Turkey and then claimed the Polish national title at the Four National Championships hosted by Hungary. They were subsequently nominated to compete at the 2023 European Championships in Espoo, Finland.

== Programs ==
=== Ice dance with Pavel Golovishnikov ===
Season	Rhythm dance	Free dance
2022–2023	Samba: Magalenha by Sérgio Mendes; Rhumba: Perfidia; Samba: Hip Hip Chin Chin	Feel It; Dad by Michele Morrone; Give 'em Hell by Everybody Loves an Outlaw
2021–2022	Swing: I Won't Dance by Willie Nelson, Diana Krall; Jazz: Love by Nat King Cole	Earned It by The Weeknd; Crazy in Love by Sofia Karlberg; Done for Me by Charlie Puth, Kehlani; Notre-Dame de Paris by Riccardo Cocciante, Luc Plamondon; Les Temps des Cathédrales performed by Richard Charest; Belle performed by Daniel Lavoie; Les Sans-Papiers performed by Luck Mervil

=== With Barszczak ===
Season	Rhythm dance	Free dance
2015–2016	Waltz: Spring Waltz; Foxtrot: The Umbrellas of Cherbourg performed by Frank Sinatra	Candyman by Christina Aguilera

== Competitive highlights ==
- JGP – Event of the ISU Junior Grand Prix Series
- CS – Event of the ISU Challenger Series
- WD – Withdrew from competition

=== Ice dance with Pavel Golovishnikov ===
Competition placements at senior level
Season	2019–20	2020–21	2021–22	2022–23	2023–24	2024–25
World Championships			28th	22nd		
European Championships				16th		
Polish Championships	3rd	2nd	2nd	1st	3rd	2nd
Four Nationals Championships	3rd	2nd	5th	3rd	7th	7th
CS Budapest Trophy				10th	16th	
CS Denis Ten Memorial					9th	
CS Nepela Memorial				10th		
CS Warsaw Cup			13th	5th	WD	18th
Bosphorus Cup				1st	14th	
Mezzaluna Cup			4th		12th	
NRW Trophy				2nd		9th
Viktor Petrenko Cup			3rd			

=== With Barszczak ===
International
Event	2015–16	2016–17	2017–18
CS Tallinn Trophy			12th
CS Warsaw Cup			12th
Santa Claus Cup			9th
Volvo Open Cup			8th
International: Junior
JGP Poland	17th		
Ice Star		14th	
NRW Trophy		16th	
Open d'Andorra	5th		
Santa Claus Cup		11th	
National
Polish Champ.		1st J	3rd
