= Vanesa Šelmeková =

Slovak figure skater

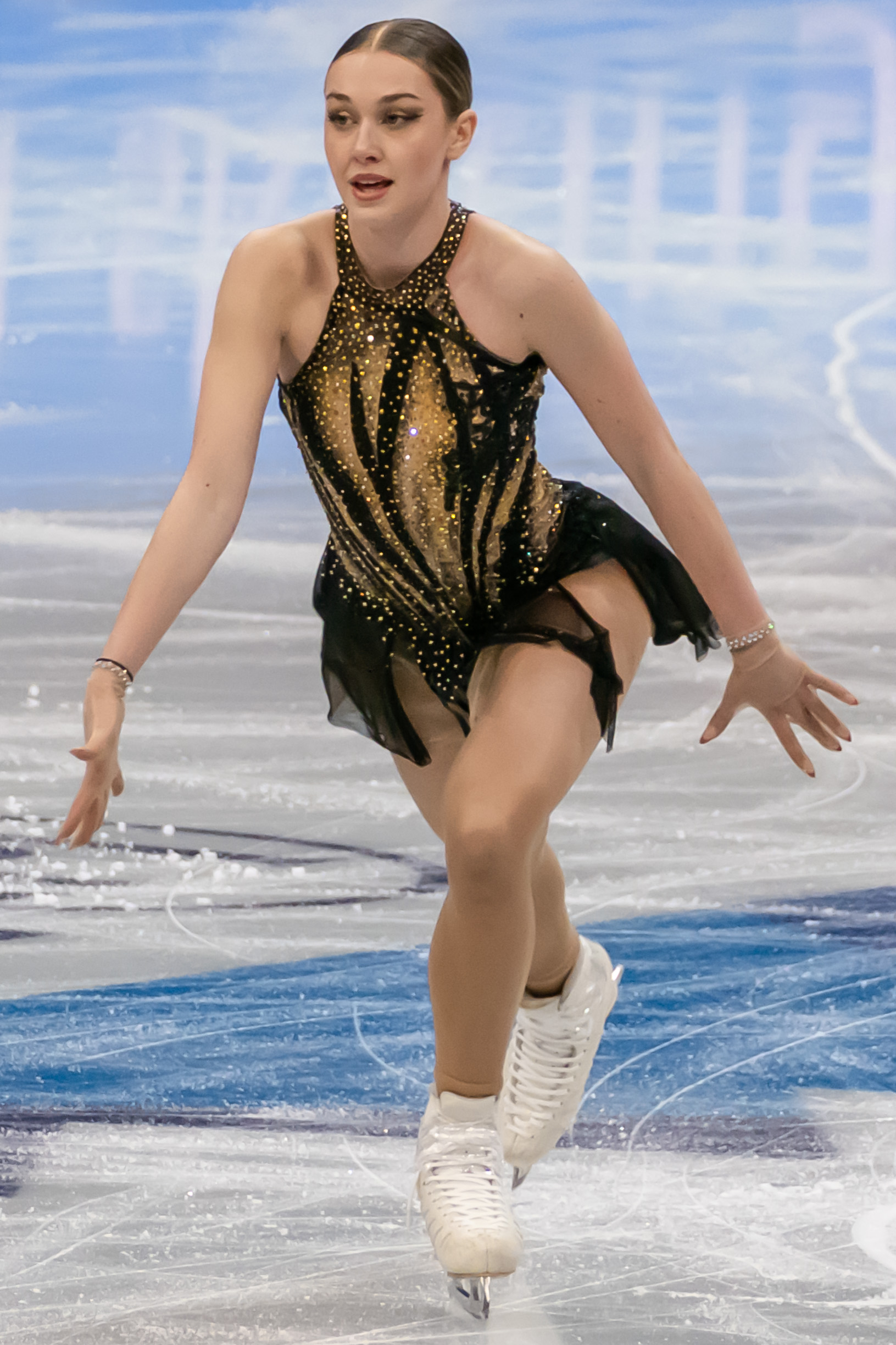
- Vanesa Šelmeková at the 2025 World Championships

Personal information
- Born: 20 January 2007 (age 19) Žilina, Slovakia
- Home town: Žilina
- Height: 1.69 m (5 ft 6 1/2 in)

Figure skating career
- Country: Slovakia
- Discipline: Women's singles
- Coach: Vladimir Dvoynikov; Rastislav Vrlak
- Skating club: FSC Zilina
- Began skating: 2012

Medal record
Slovak Championships
Gold medal – first place	2024 Turnov	Singles
Gold medal – first place	2025 Cieszyn	Singles
Gold medal – first place	2026 Presov	Singles
Bronze medal – third place	2023 Budapest	Singles

Vanesa Šelmeková (born 20 January 2007) is a Slovak figure skater. She is the 2024 Tirnavia Ice Cup champion, the 2023 Tirnavia Ice Cup silver medalist, the 2024 Dragon Trophy bronze medalist, and a three-time Slovak national champion (2024-26).

== Personal life ==
Šelmeková was born on 20 January 2007 in Žilina, Slovakia.

== Career ==
=== Early years ===
Šelmeková began learning how to skate when she was five years old. Her mother Monika put her into the sport on the recommendation of a friend based on Šelmeková's early love of singing, dancing, and listening to music.

=== 2021–2022 season: Junior debut ===
Šelmeková made her junior international level debut on the 2021–22 ISU Junior Grand Prix series, placing fourteenth at 2021 JGP France and at the 2021 JGP Slovakia. Continuing to compete on the junior level, Šelmeková won the bronze medal at the 2021 Tirnavia Ice Cup, bronze at 2021 Skate Celje, placing tenth at the 2021 Santa Claus Cup, and winning bronze at the 2022 Bellu Memorial.

Selected to compete at the 2022 World Junior Championships in Tallinn, Estonia, Šelmeková placed thirty-fifth in the short program and did not advance to the free skate segment.

=== 2022–2023 season: Senior international debut ===
Šelmeková started the season by competing on the 2022–23 ISU Junior Grand Prix series, placing fourteenth at 2022 JGP Czech Republic and twenty-second at 2022 JGP Poland. She then moved up to the senior level, finishing fourth at the 2022 Tirnavia Ice Cup and tenth at the 2022 Santa Claus Cup.

In December, she finished eleventh at the 2023 Four Nationals Championships. Selected to compete at the 2023 European Youth Olympic Winter Festival in Pontebba, Italy, Šelmeková finished the event in sixteenth place.

After winning gold on the junior level at the 2023 Sofia Trophy, Šelmeková competed at the 2023 World Junior Championships in Calgary, Alberta, Canada and finished in twenty-eighth place.

=== 2023–2024 season: First Slovak national title, European and World Championships debut ===
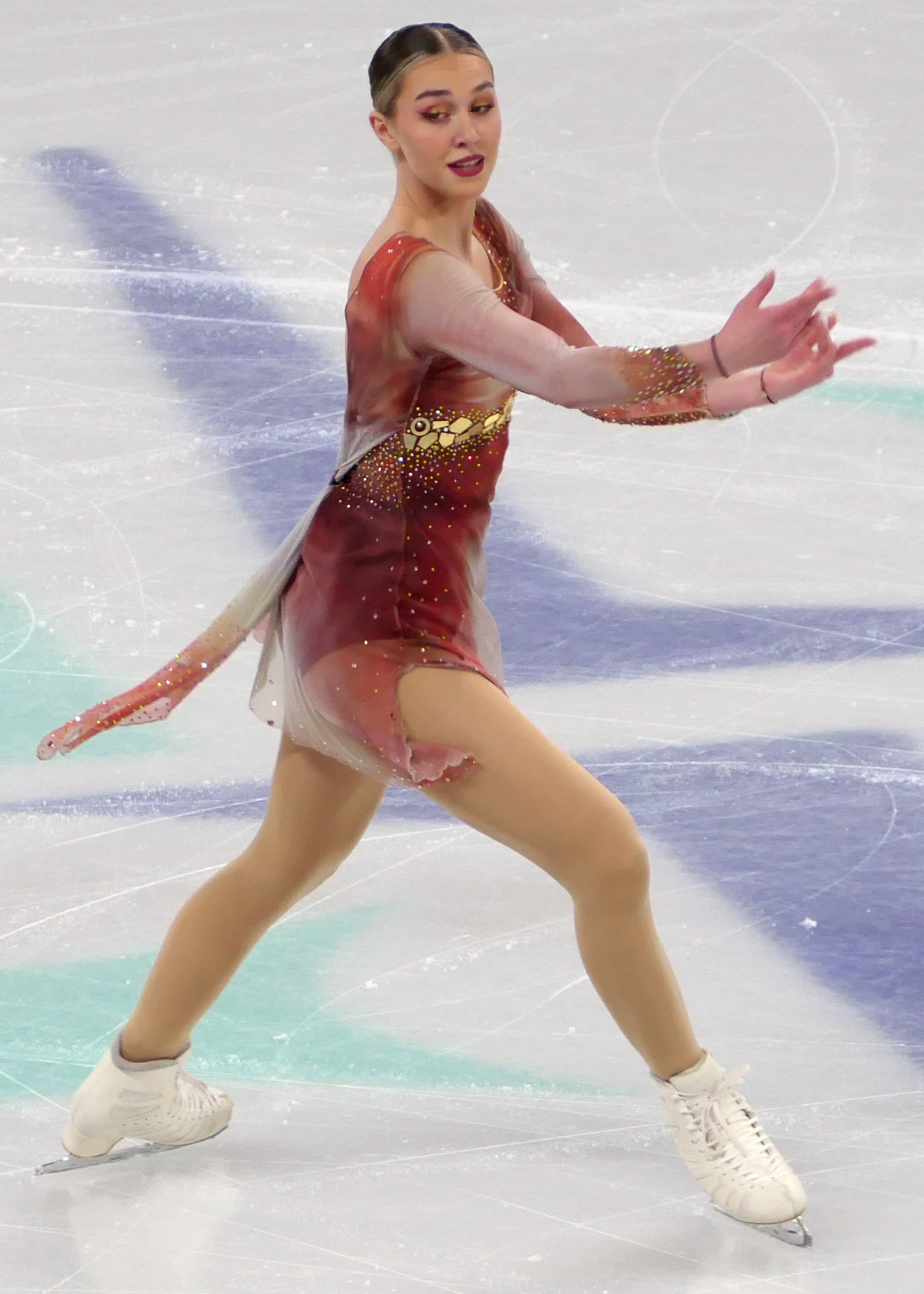
Šelmeková performing her short program at the 2024 World Championships

Šelmeková began the season by competing on the 2023–24 ISU Junior Grand Prix series, placing twenty-second at 2023 JGP Austria and nineteenth at 2023 JGP Hungary. She then competed on the senior level, placing eighth at the 2023 CS Nepela Memorial, winning silver at the 2023 Tirnavia Ice Cup, and placing twelfth at the 2023 CS Warsaw Cup.

Šelmeková then went on to compete at her first European Championships as the youngest competitor. She placed twenty-ninth in the short program and did not advance to the free skate. She followed up this event by winning bronze at the 2024 Dragon Trophy.

She met the required minimum technical scores to compete at the 2024 World Championships late in the season, and the Slovak Figure Skating Union was divided about whether to send her; they ultimately decided to do so, but if she did not mean a target technical and overall score, she would have to pay the travel expenses for the competition herself. Šelmeková therefore finished her season by competing at the World Championships. In the short program, she under-rotated her triple Lutz jump-triple toe loop jump combination and fell on her triple flip. She finished in twenty-eighth place and did not advance to the free skate. She expressed disappointment about her fall as well as not reaching the score targets set for her by the Slovak Figure Skating Union.

=== 2024–2025 season ===
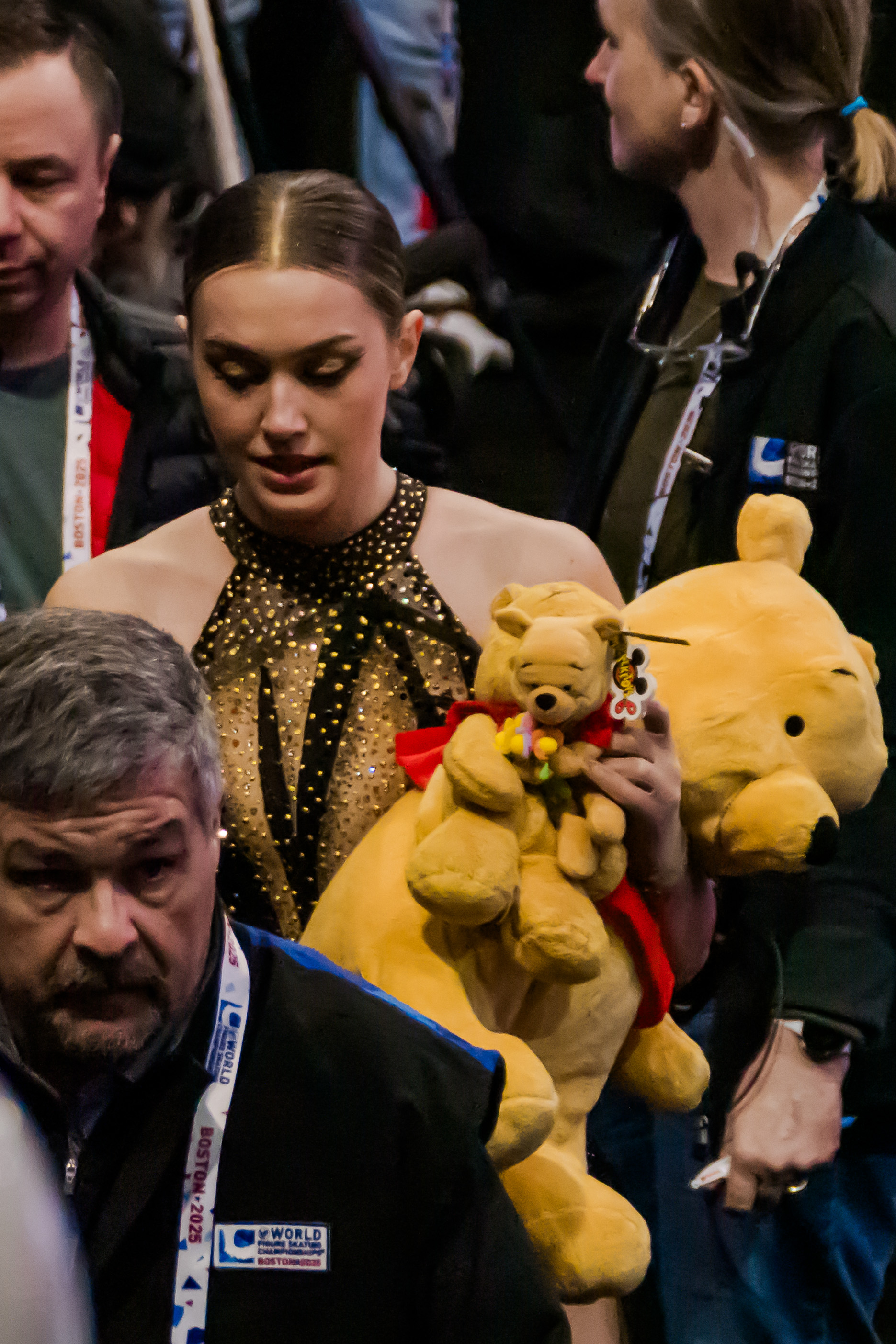
Šelmeková leaving the arena with gifts from fans after her short program at the 2025 World Championships

Šelmeková started the season by competing on the 2024–25 ISU Junior Grand Prix series, finishing twentieth at 2024 JGP Slovenia. She subsequently went on to compete on the 2024–25 ISU Challenger Series, finishing ninth at the 2024 CS Nepela Memorial and fourteenth at the 2024 CS Warsaw Cup. Between those two events, she won the gold medal at the 2024 Tirnavia Ice Cup.

In December, Šelmeková won the gold medal at the 2025 Four Nationals Championships. Following the event, she traveled to France to refine the choreography for her programs ahead of the 2025 European Championships in January.

At the European Championships, she reached the free skate after placing twenty-second in the short program; it was the first time in six years that a Slovak woman had qualified for the free skate at the European championships. In the free skate, she had one fall but otherwise landed her jumps to rise to twentieth place overall. She followed up this result with a fourth-place finish at the 2025 Dragon Trophy.

In March, Šelmeková competed at the 2025 World Championships in Boston, Massachusetts, United States. She placed twenty-sixth in the short program and did not advance to the free skate. Šelmeková later shared that while she felt more comfortable than she had at the previous year's World Championships, she became nervous, which caused her to stiffen up, and that she was still recovering from an injury that had been bothering her since before the European Championships. However, she expressed happiness that the audience reacted well to her step sequence.

=== 2025–2026 season ===
Šelmeková took two and a half months off skating to heal from a torn muscle, which formed scar tissue. She resumed training in early June and attended various training camps over the summer.

She was announced to be Slovakia's entrant in the women's singles category at the ISU Skate to Milano, the final qualifying event for the 2026 Winter Olympics. She was selected after a test skate held in August; she was the only competitor in her category after Ema Doboszová withdrew. Speaking about her performance at the test skate, Šelmeková said that she was satisfied with her short program, except for a bad landing on a Lutz jump, but that she was still becoming comfortable with her free skate. She also noted that she received feedback from the judges urging her to change her free skate costume, which had cost her a thousand Euros. At the Skate to Milano, Šelmeková finished in thirteenth place overall. She then went on to finish tenth at the 2025 CS Nepela Memorial and fifth at the 2026 Four National Championships.

In January, Šelmeková competed at the 2026 European Championships in Sheffield, England, United Kingdom, finishing in twentieth place. The following week, she won the gold medal at the 2026 EDGE Cup.

== Programs ==
Season	Short program	Free skating
2025–2026	Is It Love by Loreen choreo. by Florent Amodio	Roses by Jean-Michel Blais; Maison by Emilio Piano & Lucie choreo. by Florent Amodio
2024–2025	Is It Love by Loreen choreo. by Florent Amodio	Hometown Glory by Adele choreo. by Florent Amodio
2023–2024	Golden Hour (Instrumental); Golden Hour by Jvke choreo. by Georgi Chernyshov, Libor Hlaváček	Forbidden Love (from Romeo & Juliet) by Abel Korzeniowski; Le di ala caza alcance by Estrella Morente choreo. by Georgi Chernyshov, Libor Hlaváček
2022–2023	Eyes on Fire by Blue Foundation; Supermassive Black Hole by Muse choreo. by Georgi Chernyshov	Forbidden Love (from Romeo & Juliet) by Abel Korzeniowski; Le di ala caza alcance by Estrella Morente choreo. by Georgi Chernyshov, Libor Hlaváček
2021–2022	It's a New Day by Anouk choreo. by Dmytro Ignatenko, Bibiána Srbecká	California Dreamin' performed by Sia choreo. by Dmytro Ignatenko, Bibiána Srbecká

== Competitive highlights ==
- JGP – Event of the ISU Junior Grand Prix
- CS – Event of the ISU Challenger Series
- TBD – Assigned
- WD – Withdrew from competition

Competition placements at senior level
Season	2022–23	2023–24	2024–25	2025–26
World Championships		30th	26th	
European Championships		29th	20th	20th
Slovak Championships	3rd	1st	1st	1st
Four Nationals Championships	11th	2nd	1st	5th
CS Ondrej Nepela Memorial		8th	9th	10th
CS Warsaw Cup		12th	14th	
Dragon Trophy		3rd	4th	
EDGE Cup				1st
Santa Claus Cup	10th			
Skate to Milano				13th
Tirnavia Ice Cup	4th	2nd	1st	

Competition placements at junior level
Season	2021–22	2022–23	2023–24	2024–25
World Junior Championships	35th	28th		
Slovak Championships	1st	2nd		
JGP Austria			22nd	
JGP Czech Republic		14th		
JGP France	14th			
JGP Hungary			19th	
JGP Poland		22nd		
JGP Slovakia	14th			
JGP Slovenia				19th
Bellu Memorial	3rd			
European Youth Olympic Festival		16th		
Santa Claus Cup	10th			
Skate Celje	2nd			
Sofia Trophy		1st		
Tirnavia Ice Cup	1st			

== Detailed results ==
ISU personal best scores in the +5/-5 GOE System
Segment	Type	Score	Event
Total	TSS	155.16	2025 CS Nepela Memorial
Short program	TSS	56.34	2025 CS Nepela Memorial
Short program	TES	30.60	2025 CS Nepela Memorial
Short program	PCS	25.74	2025 CS Nepela Memorial
Free skating	TSS	102.89	2023 CS Nepela Memorial
Free skating	TES	53.23	2023 CS Nepela Memorial
Free skating	PCS	52.61	2025 CS Nepela Memorial

Results in the 2024–25 season
Date	Event	SP		FS		Total	
Date	Event	P	Score	P	Score	P	Score
Oct 2–5, 2024	2024 JGP Slovenia	13	50.42	23	71.30	19	121.72
Oct 25–27, 2024	(Slovakia) 2024 CS Nepela Memorial	10	49.33	8	94.16	9	143.49
Nov 1–3, 2024	(Slovakia) 2024 Tirnavia Ice Cup	1	56.31	1	108.66	1	164.97
Nov 20–24, 2024	(Poland) 2024 CS Warsaw Cup	13	49.86	15	89.57	14	139.43
Dec 13–14, 2024	(Poland) 2025 Four National Championships	1	56.93	1	118.15	1	175.08
Dec 13–14, 2024	(Slovakia) 2025 Slovak Championships (Note: The Slovak Championships are contested as part of the Four Nationals Championships.)	1	—N/a	1	—N/a	1	—N/a
Jan 28 – Feb 2, 2025	(Estonia) 2025 European Championships	22	48.94	20	86.50	20	135.44
Feb 6–9, 2025	(Slovenia) 2025 Dragon Trophy	4	52.49	4	102.18	4	154.67
Mar 25–30, 2025	(United States) 2025 World Championships	26	49.55	—N/a	—N/a	26	49.55

Results in the 2025–26 season
Date	Event	SP		FS		Total	
Date	Event	P	Score	P	Score	P	Score
Sep 18–21, 2025	(China) 2025 Skate to Milano	15	44.42	10	96.73	13	141.15
Sep 25–27, 2025	(Slovakia) 2025 CS Nepela Memorial	9	56.34	11	98.82	10	155.16
Dec 11–13, 2025	(Slovakia) 2026 Four Nationals Championships	12	41.20	4	98.36	5	139.56
Dec 11–13, 2025	(Slovakia) 2026 Slovak Championships	2	—N/a	1	—N/a	1	—N/a
Jan 13–18, 2026	(United Kingdom) 2026 European Championships	19	52.50	17	98.81	20	151.31
Jan 27 – Feb 1, 2026	(Poland) 2026 EDGE Cup	2	56.83	1	107.09	1	163.92
