= Jakub Lofek =

Polish figure skater (born 2005)

Personal information
- Born: 3 December 2005 (age 20) Oświęcim, Poland
- Height: 1.73 m (5 ft 8 in)

Figure skating career
- Country: Poland
- Discipline: Men's singles
- Coach: Ewa Lofek; Vladimir Dvojnikov
- Skating club: UKŁF Unia Oświęcim
- Began skating: 2011

Medal record
Polish Championships
Bronze medal – third place	2024 Turnov	Singles
Bronze medal – third place	2025 Cieszyn	Singles
Bronze medal – third place	2026 Presov	Singles

Jakub Lofek (born 3 December 2005) is a Polish figure skater. He is a three-time Polish national bronze medalist (2024-26) and qualified to the final segment at the 2022 World Junior Championships and the 2023 World Junior Championships.

== Career ==
Jakub Lofek began learning to skate as a five-year-old. He is coached by his mother, Ewa Lofek.

He made his ISU Junior Grand Prix (JGP) debut in August 2019, placing 16th in Courchevel, France. His best JGP result, seventh, came in August 2021, also in Courchevel.

In the 2021–22 season, Lofek won the Polish national junior title and was nominated to represent his country at the 2022 World Junior Championships in Tallinn, Estonia, where he qualified to the final segment.

In March 2023, he advanced to the free skate at the 2023 World Junior Championships in Calgary, Canada.

== Programs ==
Season	Short program	Free skate	Ref.
2019–20	"Assassin's Tango" (from Mr. & Mrs. Smith) By John Powell Choreo. by Kamil Białas	The Godfather Part II By Nino Rota Choreo. by Kamil Białas	
2021–22	"Stairway to Heaven" By Led Zeppelin Performed by Rodrigo y Gabriela Choreo. by Kamil Białas	The Godfather Part II By Nino Rota Choreo. by Kamil Białas	
2022–23	"Stairway to Heaven" By Led Zeppelin Performed by Rodrigo y Gabriela Choreo. by Kamil Białas	"Minnie the Moocher" By Cab Calloway Performed by Big Bad Voodoo Daddy Choreo. by Kamil Białas	
2023–24	"Ain't No Sunshine" By Bill Withers; "California Dreamin'" By John Phillips & Michelle Phillips Performed by Bobby Womack Choreo. by Kamil Białas	"Minnie the Moocher" By Cab Calloway Performed by Big Bad Voodoo Daddy Choreo. by Kamil Białas	
2024–25			

== Competitive highlights ==
- JGP – Event of the ISU Junior Grand Prix Series
- CS – Event of the ISU Challenger Series

Competition placements at senior level
Season	2024–25	2025–26	2026–27
Europeans		25th	
Polish Championships	3rd	3rd	
Four Nationals Championships	7th	6th	
CS Golden Spin of Zagreb		19th	
CS Nepela Memorial		18th	
CS Tallinn Trophy			8th
CS Warsaw Cup	12th	8th	
Bellu Memorial	5th		
Cup of Innsbruck		3rd	
Diamond Spin	2nd	3rd	2nd
Maria Olszewska Memorial	5th	4th	
Tirnavia Ice Cup	2nd		
Winter University Games	27th		

Competition placements at junior level
Season	2018–19	2019–20	2020–21	2021–22	2022–23	2023–24	2024–25
World Junior Championships				24th	19th	11th	
Polish Championships (Senior)				4th	4th	3rd	
Four Nationals Championships (Senior)				10th	9th	7th	
Polish Championships (Junior)	3rd	3rd	4th	1st	2nd	1st	
JGP Czech Republic							13th
JGP France		16th		7th			
JGP Poland I		22nd		14th	12th	5th	10th
JGP Poland II					15th		
JGP Turkey						8th	
Diamond Spin						1st	
European Youth Olympic Festival				9th			
Golden Spin of Zagreb		4th					
Icebeat Winter Trophy						1st	
NRW Trophy						3rd	
Santa Claus Cup				7th			
Volvo Open Cup					6th		

== Detailed results ==
ISU personal best scores in the +5/-5 GOE System
Segment	Type	Score	Event
Total	TSS	199.35	2025 CS Warsaw Cup
Short program	TSS	75.55	2024 World Junior Championships
Short program	TES	41.85	2024 World Junior Championships
Short program	PCS	33.70	2024 World Junior Championships
Free skating	TSS	137.17	2025 CS Warsaw Cup
Free skating	TES	67.57	2025 CS Warsaw Cup
Free skating	PCS	69.80	2024 World Junior Championships

=== Senior level ===
Results in the 2023-24 season
Date	Event	SP		FS		Total	
Date	Event	P	Score	P	Score	P	Score
Dec 14-16, 2023	(Czech Republic) 2023 Four Nationals Championships	8	58.84	6	115.15	7	173.99
Dec 14-16, 2023	(Poland) 2023 Polish Championships (Note: In Poland, the Polish Championships are contested as part of the Four Nationals Championships.)	4	—N/a	3	—N/a	3	—N/a

Results in the 2024–25 season
Date	Event	SP		FS		Total	
Date	Event	P	Score	P	Score	P	Score
Oct 15–20, 2024	(Poland) 2024 Diamond Spin	2	54.27	2	118.98	2	173.25
Nov 1–3, 2024	(Slovakia) 2024 Tirnavia Ice Cup	3	53.73	1	114.15	2	167.88
Nov 20–24, 2024	(Poland) 2024 CS Warsaw Cup	14	59.87	11	118.70	12	178.57
Dec 13–15, 2024	(Poland) 2025 Four Nationals Championships	5	70.23	7	125.46	7	195.69
Dec 13–15, 2024	(Poland) 2025 Polish Championships	3	—N/a	3	—N/a	3	—N/a
Jan 16–18, 2025	(Italy) 2025 Winter World University Games	27	54.44	—N/a	—N/a	27	54.44
Feb 18–23, 2025	(Romania) 2025 Bellu Memorial	5	59.96	4	121.53	4	181.49
Mar 4-9, 2025	(Poland) 2025 Maria Olszewska Memorial	4	60.42	5	105.44	5	165.86

Results in the 2025-26 season
Date	Event	SP		FS		Total	
Date	Event	P	Score	P	Score	P	Score
Sep 25-27, 2025	(Slovakia) 2025 CS Nepela Memorial	17	63.14	17	113.75	18	176.89
Oct 16-19, 2025	(Poland) 2025 Diamond Spin	2	63.04	3	115.53	3	178.57
Nov 13-16, 2025	(Austria) 2025 Cup of Innsbruck	3	67.92	3	114.90	3	182.82
Nov 19–23, 2025	(Poland) 2025 CS Warsaw Cup	12	62.18	5	137.17	8	199.35
Dec 3–6, 2025	(Croatia) 2025 CS Golden Spin of Zagreb	17	63.71	20	110.93	19	174.64
Dec 11-13, 2025	(Slovakia) 2026 Four Nationals Championships	6	60.84	6	116.35	6	177.19
Dec 11-13, 2025	(Poland) 2026 Polish Championships	3	—N/a	3	—N/a	3	—N/a
Jan 13-18, 2026	(United Kingdom) 2026 European Championships	25	59.76	—N/a	—N/a	25	59.76
Feb 24-28, 2026	(Poland) 2026 Maria Olszewska Memorial	4	67.98	4	122.76	4	190.74

Results in the 2026–27 season
Date	Event	SP		FS		Total	
Date	Event	P	Score	P	Score	P	Score
Oct 15-18, 2026	(Poland) 2026 Diamond Spin	2	68.03	2	130.25	2	198.28
Nov 16–22, 2026	(Estonia) 2026 CS Tallinn Trophy	12	61.09	5	129.39	8	190.48
