= Barbora Vránková =

Czech figure skater

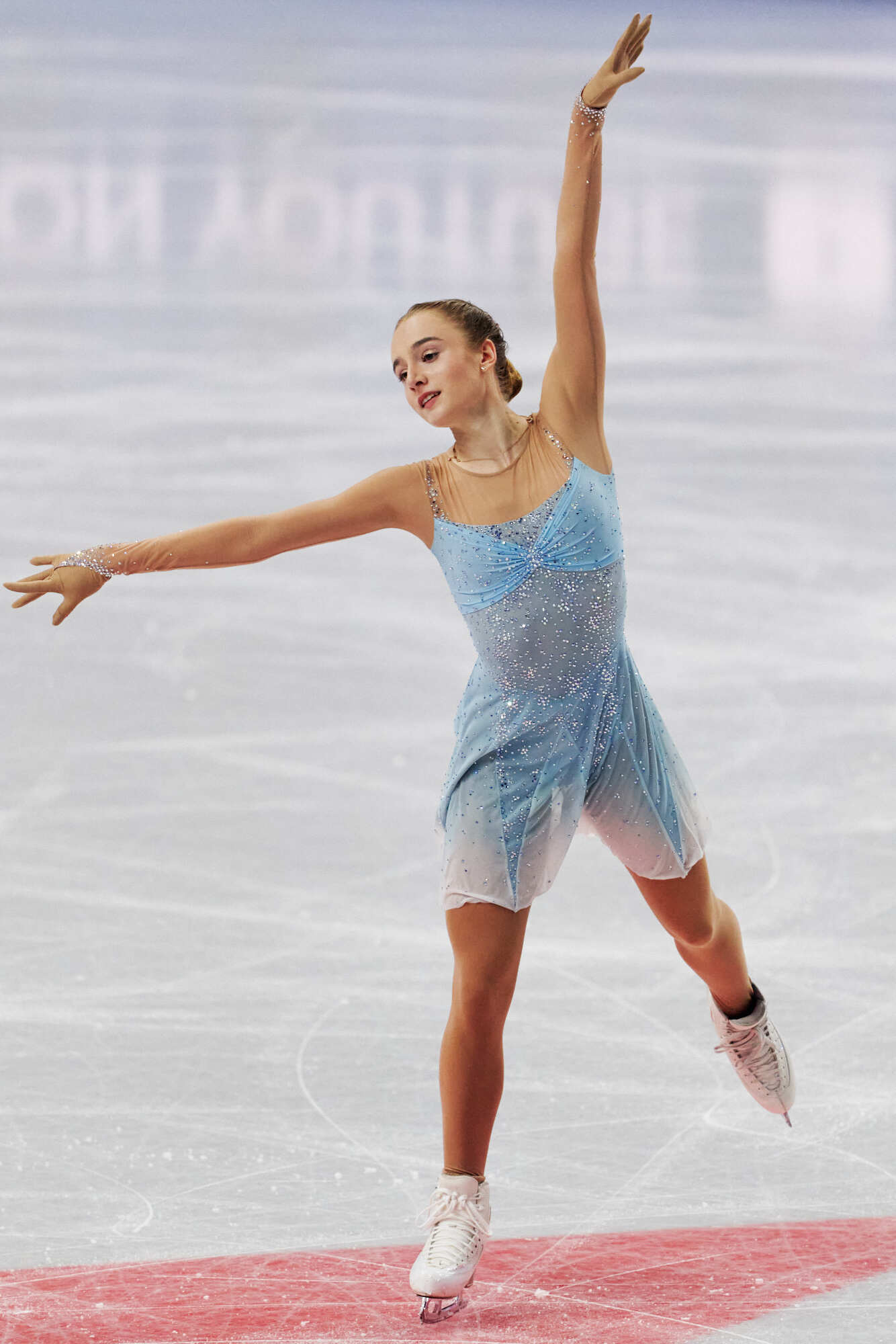
- Vránková at the 2026 World Championships

Personal information
- Born: 29 July 2006 (age 20) Břeclav, Czech Republic
- Home town: Hodonín, Czech Republic
- Height: 164 cm (5 ft 5 in)

Figure skating career
- Country: Czech Republic
- Coach: Sergei Rozanov; Polina Shuboderova; Michaela Milčinská
- Skating club: SVC KK Baník Hodonín
- Began skating: 2011

Medal record
Czech Championships
Gold medal – first place	2026 Prešov	Singles
Gold medal – first place	2024 Turnov	Singles
Gold medal – first place	2023 Budapest	Singles
Bronze medal – third place	2025 Cieszyn	Singles

Barbora Vránková (born 29 July 2006) is a Czech figure skater. She is a three-time Czech national champion, the 2026 Sofia Trophy champion and the 2026 Cup of Innsbruck gold medalist. She has represented the Czech Republic at the World and European championships.

== Personal life ==
Vránková was born on 29 July 2006 in Břeclav, Czech Republic. She trains in Gap, France, as well as Ritten, Italy. She can speak Czech, Russian and English.

== Career ==
=== Early career ===
Barbora began figure skating in 2011. During her late childhood she trained in Moscow, Russia to train under Sergei Davydov and his team.

She debuted internationally on the junior level during the 2021–22 season, placing 14th at her first Junior Grand Prix, in Slovenia and 17th at the 2022 Junior World Championships.

=== 2022–23 season: Senior international debut, national champion ===
Vránková made her senior international debut at the 2022 Trinavia Ice Cup, where she won the bronze medal. She followed this by placing 20th at the 2022 Ice Challenge, as well as 15th at 2022 CS Warsaw Cup.

Vránková subsequently opted to compete on the junior level at the 2022 NRW Trophy where she won a bronze medal.

She closed out her season by finishing 2nd at the Four Nationals Championships, based on other country placements and the rules of the competition, this made her the 2023 Czech national champion.

=== 2023–24 season: European championship debut, two-time national champion ===
Barbora opened her season in the United States by competing at 2023 Kings Cup, finishing in fourth place.

At her two Challenger Series competitions, she placed 15th at the 2023 Budapest Trophy and 18th at 2023 CS Warsaw Cup. Subsequently, she placed 3rd overall at the Four Nationals Championships, making her a two-time Czech national champion.

Vránková closed out her season by debuting at the 2024 European Championships in Kaunas, Lithuania. She finished both program segments in 24th, finishing in 24th place overall.

=== 2024–25 season: Bronze national medal ===
Barbora opened her season in the United States by competing at 2024 Cranberry Cup, placing 12th overall. She followed this by placing 8th at the 2024 Volvo Open, as well as 14th at the 2024 Denkova-Staviski Cup.

At the 2025 Four National Championships, Barbora finished in 10th overall after struggling during her free skating segment. She received five under rotation calls and two falls. Albeit this, country placements led Barbora to hold onto the bronze medal position for Czech skaters.

Vránková closed out her season finishing 10th at the 2025 Dragon Trophy.

=== 2025–26 season: Three-time national champion, World Championships debut ===
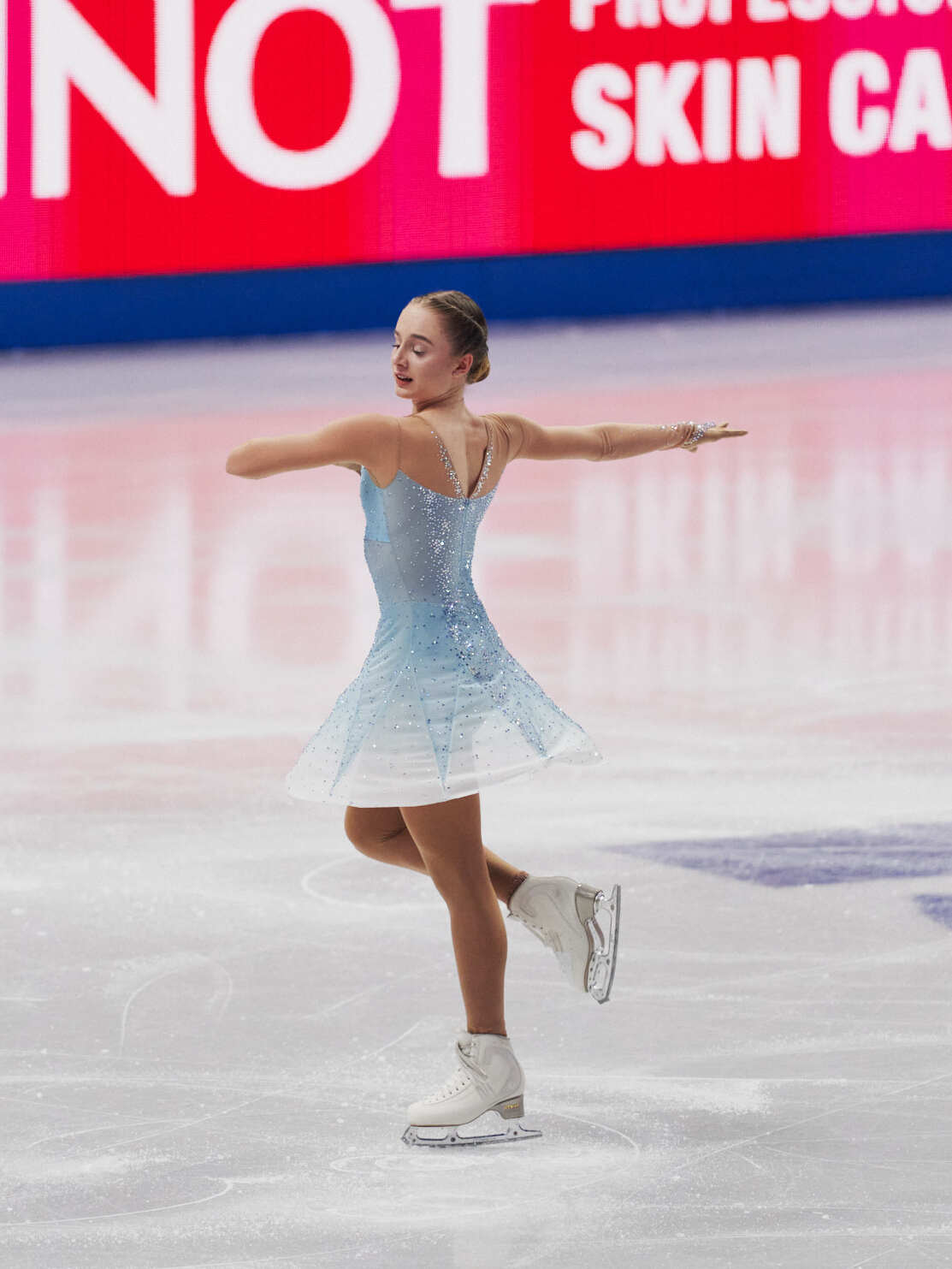
Vránková competing at the 2026 World Championships

Opening the Olympic season, Vránková competed at the 2025 Ondrej Nepela Memorial finishing in 17th place. She followed this by placing fourth at the 2025 Budapest Trophy, as well as the 2025 Diamond Spin.

Vránková went on to win the bronze medal at the 2025 Cup of Innsbruck. She then placed 5th at the 2025 Santa Claus Cup.

At the 2026 Four National Championships, she placed 2nd overall behind Ekaterina Kurakova of Poland. Following calculations of country placements, she won her third national title, making her a three-time Czech gold medalist. In the following weeks, she would go onto win the gold medal at the 2026 Sofia Trophy.

At the 2026 European Championships in Sheffield, England, Vránková placed 34th after the short program and did not advance to the free skate. The following week, she won the bronze medal at the 2026 Merano Ice Trophy. At this competition, she achieved her technical minimum scores to compete at the upcoming World Championships, which would be held in Prague in her home country, the Czech Republic.

Vránková placed 4th overall at the 2026 Skate Berlin.

She was selected by her federation to compete at the 2026 World Championships. She placed 24th across both program segments, achieving new season best scores overall and in the short program segment. She finished the event in 24th overall.

== Programs ==
Season	Short program	Free skating	Exhibition
2026–2027	This is Who I Am by Celeste & Jamie Hartman	"Les Miserables": Les Miserables by Claude-Michel Schönberg and Alain Boublil; On My Own by Samantha Barks, Claude-Michel Schönberg; I Dreamed A Dream by Anne Hathaway, Claude-Michel Schönberg choreo. by Polina Shuboderova	
2025–2026	Clouds, The Mind on the (Re)Wind by Ezio Bosso choreo. by Polina Shuboderova	Rose; Hard to Starboard by James Horner; My Heart Will Go On (from "Titanic" soundtrack) by Celine Dion, James Horner, Will Jennings choreo. by Rohene Ward & Nadia Kanaeva	On My Head by Dan Bárta
2024–2025	Clouds, The Mind on the (Re)Wind by Ezio Bosso choreo. by Polina Shuboderova	Rose; Hard to Starboard by James Horner; My Heart Will Go On (from "Titanic" soundtrack) by Celine Dion, James Horner, Will Jennings choreo. by Rohene Ward & Nadia Kanaeva	
2024–2025	Clouds, The Mind on the (Re)Wind by Ezio Bosso choreo. by Polina Shuboderova	A Thousand Times Good Night by Abel Korzeniowski; Kissing You by Craig Armstrong; Dance Of The Knights from ("Romeo and Juliet" soundtrack) composed by Sergei Prokofiev choreo. by Rohene Ward & Nadia Kanaeva	
2023–2024	One Day I'll Fly Away by Nicole Kidman, Joe Sample	Extremely Loud & Incredibly Close by Alexandre Desplat & Jean-Yves Thibaudet; Flying by Dan Cullen, Deryn Cullen choreo. by Angelina Turenko, Barbora Řezníčková & Gabriele Frangipani	
2022–2023	Liebestraum composed by Franz Liszt choreo. by Viktoria Bondarenko	Extremely Lound and Incredible Close by Alexandre Desplat & Jean-Yves Thibaudet; Flying by Dan Cullen choreo. by Angelina Turenko, Barbora Silná & Gabriele Frangipani	

== Competitive highlights ==
Competition placements at senior level
Season	2022–23	2023–24	2024–25	2025–26	2026–27
World Championships				24th	
European Championships		24th		34th	
Four Nationals Championships	2nd	3rd	10th	2nd	
CS Budapest Trophy		15th		4th	
CS Ice Challenge	20th				
CS Nepela Memorial				17th	
CS Warsaw Cup	15th	18th			
CS Cranberry Cup			12th		
CS Tallinn Trophy					8th
Diamond Spin				3rd	
Ice Challenge					5th
Merano Ice Trophy				3rd	
Kings Cup International		4th			
Santa Claus Cup				5th	
Skate Berlin				4th	
Sofia Trophy				1st	
Tayside Trophy					7th
Tirnavia Ice Cup	3rd				
Volvo Open Cup			8th		
Dragon Trophy			10th		
Denkova-Staviski Cup			14th		
Cup of Innsbruck				4th	

Competition placements at junior level
Season	2021–22	2022–23
World Junior Championships	17th	
JGP Slovenia	14th	
JGP Poland		18th
Budapest Trophy	4th	
Egna Spring Trophy	5th	
NRW Trophy		3rd

== Detailed results ==
ISU personal best scores in the +5/-5 GOE System
Segment	Type	Score	Event
Total	TSS	165.24	2026 CS Tallinn Trophy
Short program	TSS	54.40	2026 CS Tallinn Trophy
Short program	TES	29.61	2022 World Junior Championships
Short program	PCS	26.86	2026 CS Tallinn Trophy
Free skating	TSS	110.84	2026 CS Tallinn Trophy
Free skating	TES	56.23	2026 CS Tallinn Trophy
Free skating	PCS	54.61	2026 CS Tallinn Trophy
