= Aleksandr Vlasenko =

Hungarian figure skater

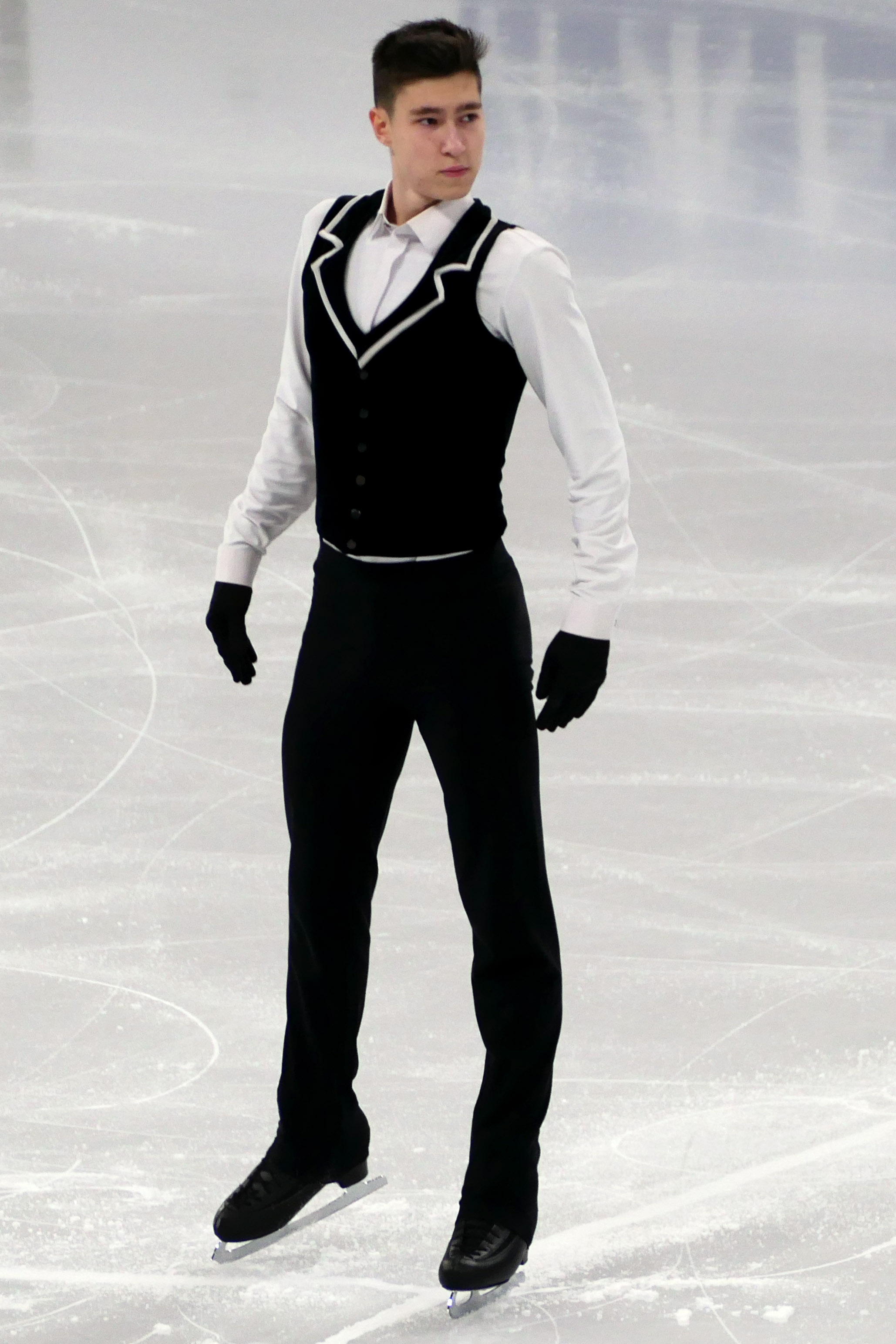
- Vlasenko at the 2024 World Championships

Personal information
- Born: 3 July 2004 (age 22) Tyumen, Russia
- Home town: Budapest, Hungary
- Height: 1.82 m (5 ft 11 1/2 in)

Figure skating career
- Country: Hungary (since 2021); Russia (until 2018)
- Discipline: Men's singles
- Coach: Júlia Sebestyén; Szabolcs Vidrai
- Skating club: Ferencvárosi Torna Club

Medal record
Hungarian Championships
Gold medal – first place	2023 Budapest	Singles
Gold medal – first place	2024 Turnov	Singles
Gold medal – first place	2025 Cieszyn	Singles
Silver medal – second place	2022 Spišská Nová Ves	Singles

Aleksandr Vlasenko (born 3 July 2004) is a Russian figure skater who currently competes for Hungary. He is a three-time Hungarian national champion (2023–25), 2022 Jégvirág Cup champion, and the 2024 Dragon Trophy champion.

== Personal life ==
Aleksandr Vlasenko was born in Tyumen, Russia. His younger brother, Alexsei, is also a competitive figure skater.

== Career ==
=== 2024–25 season ===
Vlasenko began the season with a sixth-place finish at the 2024 Budapest Trophy, earning personal best scores in the short program, free skate, and total score. He then went on to finish nineteenth at the 2024 Tallinn Trophy. At the 2024 Santa Claus Cup, Vlasenko finished second in the short program, earning the minimum technical element score to compete at the 2025 World Figure Skating Championships. At the 2025 Four Nationals Championships, he finished in sixth place.

== Programs ==
Season	Short program	Free skating
2021–22	Feeling Good by Michael Bublé choreo. by Adam Solya, Martine Dagenais	The One by Elton John choreo. by Adam Solya, Martine Dagenais
2022–23	Une vie d'amour by Charles Aznavour choreo. by Adam Solya	Medley by Elvis Presley choreo. by Adam Solya
2023–24	Une vie d'amour by Charles Aznavour choreo. by Adam Solya	Iron Sky by Paolo Nutini choreo. by Adam Solya
2024–25	Standards by Leslie Odom Jr. choreo. by Adam Solya	The Boy King by Elitsa Alexandrova; Do You? by TroyBoi choreo. by Adam Solya
2025–26	The Moon Over the Ruined Castle by Cyril Baranov; Taiko Shuffle by Jeff van Dyck; Kinja Bang by TroyBoi choreo. by Adam Solya	The Boy King by Elitsa Alexandrova; Do You? by TroyBoi choreo. by Adam Solya

== Competitive highlights ==
- JGP – Event of the ISU Junior Grand Prix Series
- CS – Event of the ISU Challenger Series
- TBD – Assigned
- WD – Withdrew from competition

Competition placements at senior level
Season	2021–22	2022–23	2023–24	2024–25	2025–26
World Championships	29th		40th	29th	
European Championships		24th	23rd	21st	
Hungarian Championships	2nd	1st	1st	1st	
Four Nationals Championships	8th	5th	4th	6th	
CS Budapest Trophy		12th	13th	6th	
CS Nepela Memorial		10th	14th		
CS Tallinn Trophy				19th	
Challenge Cup	12th				
Dragon Trophy		WD	1st		
Jégvirág Cup	1st				
Santa Claus Cup		3rd		3rd	
Skate Helena	2nd				
Skate to Milano					12th
Sonja Henie Trophy				5th	
Volvo Open Cup		6th	3rd		
Winter University Games				11th	

Competition placements at junior level
Season	2021–22	2022–23	2023–24
World Junior Championships	27th	21st	21st
JGP Austria			12th
JGP Czech Republic		11th	
JGP Hungary			14th
JGP Slovakia	16th		
Santa Claus Cup	2nd		

== Detailed results ==
ISU personal best scores in the +5/-5 GOE System
Segment	Type	Score	Event
Total	TSS	194.18	2025 Skate to Milano
Short program	TSS	70.25	2025 World Championships
Short program	TES	37.50	2025 World Championships
Short program	PCS	32.75	2025 World Championships
Free skating	TSS	125.88	2025 Skate to Milano
Free skating	TES	66.09	2024 World Junior Championships
Free skating	PCS	62.95	2025 Skate to Milano

=== Senior level ===
Results in the 2021–22 season
Date	Event	SP		FS		Total	
Date	Event	P	Score	P	Score	P	Score
Dec 16–18, 2021	(Slovakia) 2022 Four Nationals Championships	9	51.04	7	109.94	8	160.98
Dec 16–18, 2021	(Slovakia) 2022 Hungarian Championships (Note: The Hungarian Championships are contested as part of the Four Nationals Championships.)	2	—N/a	2	—N/a	2	—N/a
Jan 19–21, 2022	(Serbia) 2022 Skate Helena	2	63.89	2	114.59	2	178.48
Feb 11–13, 2022	(Hungary) 2022 Jégvirág Cup	3	64.10	1	136.66	1	200.76
Feb 24–27, 2022	(Netherlands) 2022 Challenge Cup	14	54.00	12	116.99	12	170.99
Mar 21–27, 2022	(France) 2022 World Championships	29	51.10	—N/a	—N/a	29	51.10

Results in the 2022–23 season
Date	Event	SP		FS		Total	
Date	Event	P	Score	P	Score	P	Score
Sep 29 – Oct 1, 2022	(Slovakia) 2022 CS Nepela Memorial	8	65.20	12	111.96	10	177.16
Oct 13–16, 2022	(Hungary) 2022 CS Budapest Trophy	13	55.81	14	113.96	12	169.77
Nov 3–4, 2022	(Latvia) 47th Volvo Open Cup	5	62.30	5	119.77	6	182.07
Nov 28 – Dec 4, 2022	(Hungary) 2022 Santa Claus Cup	3	68.20	4	125.45	3	193.65
Dec 16–18, 2022	(Hungary) 2023 Four Nationals Championships	5	61.50	5	116.16	5	177.66
Dec 16–18, 2022	(Hungary) 2023 Hungarian Championships	2	—N/a	1	—N/a	1	—N/a
Jan 23–29, 2023	(Finland) 2023 European Championships	23	62.49	23	111.45	24	173.94
Feb 9–12, 2023	(Slovenia) 2023 Dragon Trophy	9	48.51	—N/a	—N/a	–	WD

Results in the 2023–24 season
Date	Event	SP		FS		Total	
Date	Event	P	Score	P	Score	P	Score
Sep 8–30, 2023	(Slovakia) 2023 CS Nepela Memorial	13	59.97	14	114.53	14	174.50
Oct 13–15, 2023	(Hungary) 2023 CS Budapest Trophy	15	57.91	13	121.37	13	179.28
Nov 2-5, 2023	(Latvia) 50th Volvo Open Cup	3	68.17	3	114.27	3	182.44
Dec 14–16, 2023	(Czech Republic) 2024 Four Nationals Championships	4	66.03	4	123.26	4	189.29
Dec 14–16, 2023	(Czech Republic) 2024 Hungarian Championships	1	—N/a	1	—N/a	1	—N/a
Jan 8–14, 2024	(Lithuania) 2024 European Championships	23	65.08	22	118.68	23	183.76
Feb 8–11, 2024	(Slovenia) 2024 Dragon Trophy	1	66.35	1	120.92	1	187.27
Mar 18–24, 2024	(Canada) 2024 World Championships	40	51.50	—N/a	—N/a	40	51.50

Results in the 2024–25 season
Date	Event	SP		FS		Total	
Date	Event	P	Score	P	Score	P	Score
Oct 11–13, 2024	(Hungary) 2024 CS Budapest Trophy	4	65.27	6	121.76	6	187.03
Nov 12–17, 2024	(Estonia) 2024 CS Tallinn Trophy	15	64.05	20	105.10	19	169.15
Nov 27 – Dec 2, 2024	(Hungary) 2024 Santa Claus Cup	2	71.78	5	127.42	3	199.20
Dec 13–14, 2024	(Poland) 2025 Four Nationals Championships	7	67.38	6	130.62	6	198.00
Dec 13–14, 2024	(Poland) 2025 Hungarian Championships	1	—N/a	1	—N/a	1	—N/a
Jan 16–18, 2025	(Italy) 2025 Winter World University Games	12	68.87	10	133.54	11	202.41
Jan 28 – Feb 2, 2025	(Estonia) 2025 European Championships	22	67.25	20	118.27	21	185.52
Mar 6–9, 2025	(Norway) 2025 Sonja Henie Trophy	5	68.23	5	122.80	5	191.03
Mar 24–30, 2025	(United States) 2025 World Championships	29	70.25	—N/a	—N/a	29	70.25

Results in the 2025–26 season
Date	Event	SP		FS		Total	
Date	Event	P	Score	P	Score	P	Score
Sep 18–21, 2025	(China) 2025 ISU Skate to Milano	11	68.30	12	125.88	12	194.18

=== Junior level ===
Results in the 2021–22 season
Date	Event	SP		FS		Total	
Date	Event	P	Score	P	Score	P	Score
Sep 1–4, 2021	2021 JGP Slovakia	15	54.30	19	89.52	16	143.82
Dec 6–12, 2021	(Hungary) 2021 Santa Claus Cup	3	55.82	1	107.56	2	163.38
Apr 13–17, 2022	(Estonia) 2022 World Junior Championships	27	53.54	—N/a	—N/a	27	53.54

Results in the 2022–23 season
Date	Event	SP		FS		Total	
Date	Event	P	Score	P	Score	P	Score
Aug 31 – Sep 3, 2023	2023 JGP Czech Republic	11	57.08	10	107.77	11	164.85
Feb 27 – Mar 5, 2023	(Canada) 2023 World Junior Championships	21	60.65	20	105.76	21	166.41

Results in the 2023–24 season
Date	Event	SP		FS		Total	
Date	Event	P	Score	P	Score	P	Score
Aug 30 – Sep 2, 2023	2023 JGP Austria	8	64.73	12	109.42	12	174.15
Sep 20–23, 2023	2023 JGP Hungary	12	52.57	13	104.22	14	156.79
Feb 26 – Mar 3, 2024	(Taiwan) 2024 World Junior Championships	24	62.12	19	119.73	21	181.85
