= Kornel Witkowski =

Polish figure skater (born 2002)

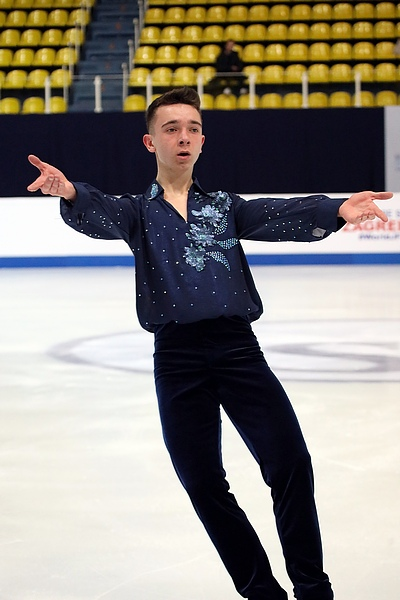
- Witkowski in 2019

Personal information
- Born: 3 January 2002 (age 24) Łódź, Poland
- Height: 1.73 m (5 ft 8 in)

Figure skating career
- Country: Poland
- Discipline: Men's singles
- Coach: Michael Huth; Nicole Schott
- Skating club: MKL Łódź
- Began skating: 2009

Medal record
Polish Championships
Gold medal – first place	2021 Cieszyn	Singles
Silver medal – second place	2022 Spišská Nová Ves	Singles
Silver medal – second place	2025 Cieszyn	Singles
Bronze medal – third place	2023 Budapest	Singles

Kornel Witkowski (born 3 January 2002) is a Polish figure skater. He is the 2021 Polish national champion and qualified to the final segment at the 2022 European Championships in Tallinn, Estonia.

== Personal life ==
His brothers, Miłosz and Wiktor Witkowski are also active figure skaters.

== Programs ==
Season	Short program	Free skating
2018–2019	The Shadow Line by Wojciech Kilar choreo. by Sebastian Kolasiński	Dirty Dancing by John Morris choreo. by Sebastian Kolasiński
2019–2020	The Shadow Line by Wojciech Kilar choreo. by Sebastian Kolasiński	Fly Me to the Moon performed by Frank Sinatra; Why Me? performed by Big Bad Voodoo Daddy choreo. by Sebastian Kolasiński
2020–2021	Make It Rain performed by Ed Sheeran choreo. by Sebastian Kolasiński	Fly Me to the Moon performed by Frank Sinatra; Why Me? performed by Big Bad Voodoo Daddy choreo. by Sebastian Kolasiński
2021–2022	Make It Rain performed by Ed Sheeran choreo. by Sebastian Kolasiński	Baby, God Bless You by Shinya Kiyozuka choreo. by Lloyd Jones
2022–2023	Another One Bites the Dust; We Will Rock You by Queen choreo. by Lloyd Jones	Baby, God Bless You by Shinya Kiyozuka choreo. by Lloyd Jones
2023–2024	Another One Bites the Dust; We Will Rock You by Queen choreo. by Lloyd Jones	Wild Side (from Tree of Life) by Roberto Cacciapaglia choreo. by Andrea Vaturi
2024–2025	Echo Sax End by Caleb Arredondo & Jimmy Sax choreo. by Andrea Vaturi	Wild Side (from Tree of Life) by Roberto Cacciapaglia choreo. by Andrea Vaturi

== Competitive highlights ==
- JGP – Event of the ISU Junior Grand Prix Series
- CS – Event of the ISU Challenger Series
- TBD – Assigned
- WD – Withdrew from competition

Competition placements at senior level
Season	2020–21	2021–22	2022–23	2023–24	2024–25	2025–26	2026–27
European Championships		18th			18th		
Polish Championships	1st	2nd	3rd	4th	2nd		
Four Nationals Championships	2nd	5th	6th	8th	5th		
CS Budapest Trophy					4th		
CS Denis Ten Memorial			5th				
CS Golden Spin of Zagreb						WD	
CS Lombardia Trophy				10th			
CS Nebelhorn Trophy			14th			11th	4th
CS Nepela Memorial				12th			
CS Tallinn Trophy				WD	11th		
CS Warsaw Cup		24th	11th	14th	4th	15th	
Challenge Cup	13th	13th					
Diamond Spin				1st	1st	1st	1st
Maria Olszewska Memorial			1st		1st	2nd	
Nordic Championships		2nd					
Skate Berlin						4th	
Tayside Trophy		7th	3rd	6th			

Competition placements at junior level
Season	2016–17	2017–18	2018–19	2019–20
World Junior Championships			37th	29th
Polish Championships	3rd	6th		1st
JGP Armenia			16th	
JGP Latvia				15th
JGP Poland				15th
Dragon Trophy			3rd	
EYEOF	13th			
Mentor Toruń Cup		5th	8th	
Warsaw Cup			9th	

== Detailed results ==
ISU personal best scores in the +5/-5 GOE System
Segment	Type	Score	Event
Total	TSS	222.69	2026 CS Nebelhorn Trophy
Short program	TSS	80.27	2026 CS Nebelhorn Trophy
Short program	TES	43.02	2026 CS Nebelhorn Trophy
Short program	PCS	37.25	2026 CS Nebelhorn Trophy
Free skating	TSS	142.22	2026 CS Nebelhorn Trophy
Free skating	TES	68.83	2026 CS Nebelhorn Trophy
Free skating	PCS	74.10	2024 CS Warsaw Cup

Results in the 2024–25 season
Date	Event	SP		FS		Total	
Date	Event	P	Score	P	Score	P	Score
Oct 11–13, 2024	(Hungary) 2024 CS Budapest Trophy	3	70.31	5	125.82	4	196.13
Oct 15–20, 2024	(Poland) 2024 Diamond Spin	1	68.50	1	128.73	1	197.23
Nov 11-17, 2024	(Estonia) 2024 CS Tallinn Trophy	9	69.61	14	121.11	11	190.72
Nov 20–24, 2024	(Poland) 2024 CS Warsaw Cup	6	70.80	4	140.25	4	211.05
Dec 13–15, 2024	(Poland) 2025 Four Nationals Championships	3	74.82	5	140.63	5	215.45
Dec 13–15, 2024	(Poland) 2025 Polish Championships (Note: The Polish Championships are contested as part of the Four Nationals Championships.)	2	—N/a	2	—N/a	2	—N/a
Jan 28 – Feb 2, 2025	(Estonia) 2025 European Championships	23	65.21	15	131.93	18	197.14
Mar 4-9, 2025	(Poland) 2025 Maria Olszewska Memorial	1	70.18	1	133.41	1	203.59

Results in the 2025-26 season
Date	Event	SP		FS		Total	
Date	Event	P	Score	P	Score	P	Score
Sep 25-27, 2025	(Germany) 2025 CS Nebelhorn Trophy	9	64.59	11	126.19	11	190.78
Oct 16-19, 2025	(Poland) 2025 Diamond Spin	1	75.23	2	139.48	1	214.71
Nov 19–23, 2025	(Poland) 2025 CS Warsaw Cup	6	67.89	17	110.98	15	178.87
Feb 17-21, 2026	(Germany) 2026 Skate Berlin International	2	81.97	6	127.35	4	209.32
Feb 24-28, 2026	(Poland) 2026 Maria Olszewska Memorial	1	81.34	2	140.97	2	222.31

Results in the 2026–27 season
Date	Event	SP		FS		Total	
Date	Event	P	Score	P	Score	P	Score
Sep 24–26, 2026	(Germany) 2026 CS Nebelhorn Trophy	4	80.27	5	142.42	4	222.69
Oct 15-18, 2026	(Poland) 2026 Diamond Spin	1	82.33	1	142.97	1	225.30
