= Regina Schermann =

Hungarian figure skater

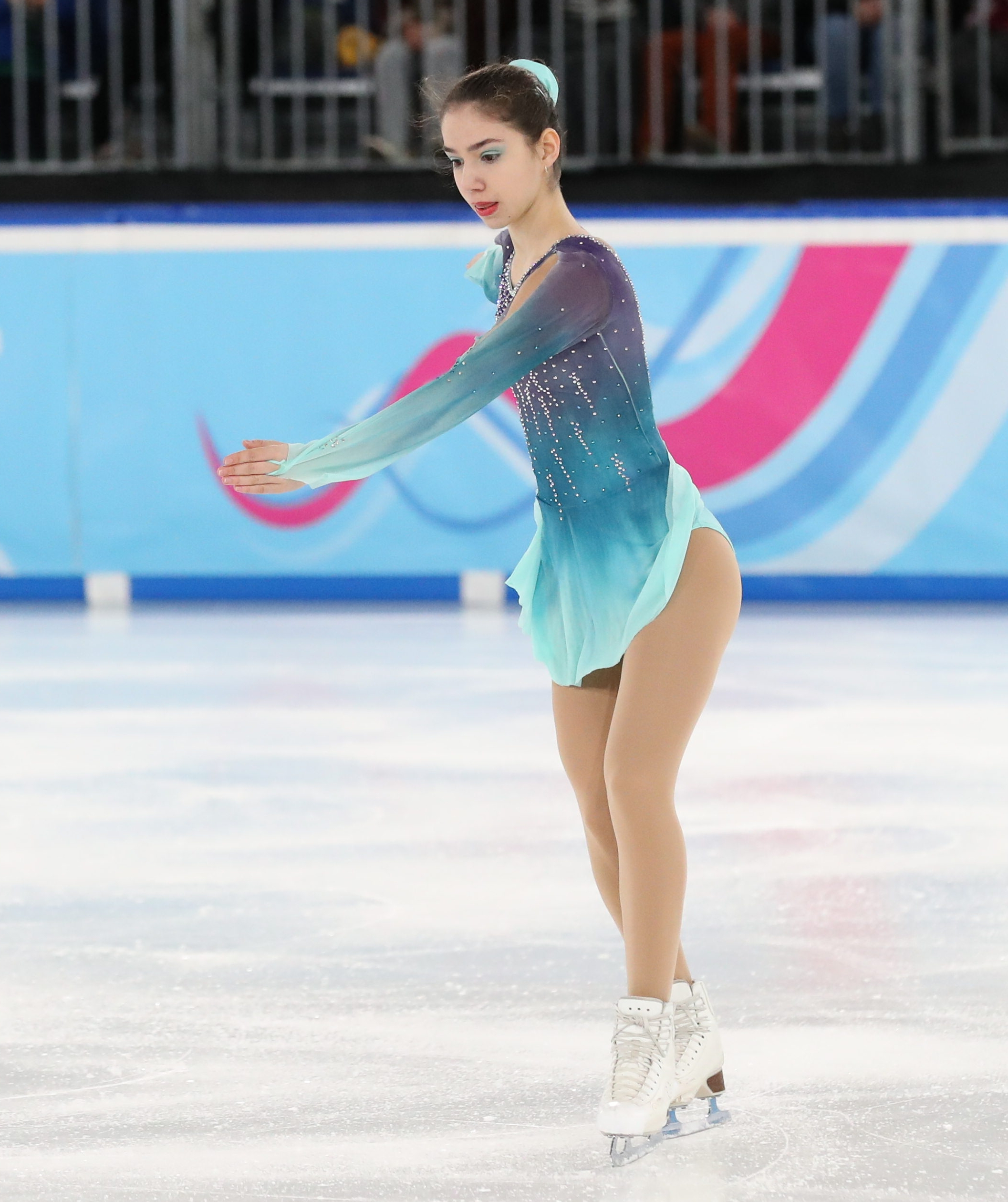
- Regina Schermann at the 2020 Winter Youth Olympics

Personal information
- Born: 23 September 2004 (age 22) Budapest, Hungary
- Height: 1.64 m (5 ft 4 1/2 in)

Figure skating career
- Country: Hungary
- Discipline: Women's singles
- Coach: Gayane Akopyan
- Skating club: KSI
- Began skating: 2008

Medal record
Hungarian Championships
Gold medal – first place	2024 Turnov	Singles
Silver medal – second place	2020 Ostrava	Singles
Silver medal – second place	2021 Budapest	Singles
Silver medal – second place	2022 Spišská Nová Ves	Singles
Silver medal – second place	2025 Cieszyn	Singles
Winter Youth Olympics
Bronze medal – third place	2020 Lausanne	Team

Regina Schermann (born 23 September 2004) is a Hungarian figure skater. She is the 2024 Hungarian national gold medalist, a three-time Hungarian national silver medalist (2020–22), and has qualified to the final segment at two ISU Championships – the 2020 World Junior Championships and 2022 European Championships.

At the 2020 Youth Olympics, she won bronze in the team event and placed 12th in the individual event.

== Personal life ==
Regina is the younger sister of artistic gymnast Bianka Schermann. Her role model is Alena Kostornaia.

== Programs ==
Season	Short program	Free skating
2023–2024	Strange Birds by Birdy choreo. by Gayane Akopyan, Tunde Sepa, and Daria Jakab	Is It Poison, Nanny?; Discombobulate; Ah, Putrefaction; Data Data Data; Catatonic (from Sherlock Holmes) by Hans Zimmer choreo. by Attila Elek, Tunde Sepa, Jeranjak Ipakjan, and Daria Jakab
2022–2023	Chalkboard; Domestic Pressures; The Dreams That Stuff is Made Of (from The Theory of Everything) by Jóhann Jóhannsson choreo. by Gayane Akopyan, Jeranjak Ipakjan, and Daria Jakab	Is It Poison, Nanny?; Discombobulate; Ah, Putrefaction; Data Data Data; Catatonic (from Sherlock Holmes) by Hans Zimmer choreo. by Attila Elek, Tunde Sepa, Jeranjak Ipakjan, and Daria Jakab
2021–22	Chalkboard; Domestic Pressures; The Dreams That Stuff is Made Of (from The Theory of Everything) by Jóhann Jóhannsson choreo. by Gayane Akopyan, Jeranjak Ipakjan, and Daria Jakab	Is It Poison, Nanny?; Discombobulate; Ah, Putrefaction; Data Data Data; Catatonic (from Sherlock Holmes) by Hans Zimmer choreo. by Attila Elek, Tunde Sepa, Jeranjak Ipakjan, and Daria Jakab
2020–21	In the House by Philippe Rombi choreo. by Gayane Akopyan, Jeranjak Ipakjan, and Daria Jakab	Chalkboard; Domestic Pressures; The Dreams That Stuff is Made Of (from The Theory of Everything) by Jóhann Jóhannsson choreo. by Gayane Akopyan, Jeranjak Ipakjan, and Daria Jakab
2019–20	In the House by Philippe Rombi choreo. by Gayane Akopyan, Jeranjak Ipakjan, and Daria Jakab	Memoirs of a Geisha by John Williams choreo. by Nóra Hoffmann and Daria Jakab
2018–19	Bad Boy, Good Man by Tape Five	Memoirs of a Geisha by John Williams choreo. by Nóra Hoffmann and Daria Jakab

== Results ==
CS: Challenger Series; JGP: Junior Grand Prix

International
Event	18–19	19–20	20–21	21–22	22–23	23-24	24–25
Europeans				22nd		28th	
CS Budapest			8th		11th	22nd	13th
CS Golden Spin						WD	
CS Ice Challenge					WD		
CS Lombardia				9th			TBD
CS Nebelhorn			WD				
CS Nepela Memorial					10th		13th
CS Warsaw Cup			WD			28th	
Budapest Trophy				6th			
Celje Open			3rd				
Challenge Cup			11th				
Santa Claus Cup			5th	2nd			
Volvo Open Cup				7th			
International: Junior
Junior Worlds		24th					
Youth Olympics		12th					
JGP Austria				14th			
JGP Czech Republic	17th						
JGP France		23rd					
JGP Latvia		15th					
Christmas Cup	6th						
GP of Bratislava	1st						
Halloween Cup	3rd	1st					
Jégvirág Cup	7th						
Santa Claus Cup		1st					
Skate Celje		2nd					
Skate Helena	6th						
Tirnavia Ice Cup		1st					
Triglav Trophy	6th						
Volvo Open Cup	5th						
National
Hungarian Champ.		2nd	2nd	2nd		1st	
Hungarian Junior	4th	1st					
Team events
Youth Olympics		3rd T 6th P					

== Detailed results ==
ISU personal best scores in the +5/-5 GOE System
Segment	Type	Score	Event
Total	TSS	157.66	2021 CS Lombardia Trophy
Short program	TSS	54.43	2022 Europeans
Short program	TES	30.84	2020 Junior Worlds
Short program	PCS	24.10	2022 Europeans
Free skating	TSS	103.62	2021 CS Lombardia Trophy
Free skating	TES	53.74	2021 CS Lombardia Trophy
Free skating	PCS	50.88	2021 CS Lombardia Trophy

Small medals for short and free programs awarded only at ISU Championships.

=== Senior results ===
2024–25 season
Date	Event	SP	FS	Total
October 24–26, 2024	2024 CS Nepela Memorial	13; 46.30	12; 85.15	13; 131.45
October 11–13, 2024	2024 CS Budapest Trophy	9; 51.59	15; 81.36	13; 132.95
2023–24 season
Date	Event	SP	FS	Total
January 10–14, 2024	2024 European Figure Skating Championships	28; 45.50	-	28; 45.50
October 13–15, 2023	2023 CS Budapest Trophy	22; 43.95	20; 88.23	12; 132.18
2022–23 season
Date	Event	SP	FS	Total
October 13–16, 2022	2022 CS Budapest Trophy	12; 48.82	9; 95.85	11; 144.67
September 29 – October 1, 2022	2022 CS Nepela Memorial	9; 42.28	8; 90.01	10; 132.29
2021–2022 season
Date	Event	SP	FS	Total
January 10–16, 2022	2022 European Championships	22; 54.43	23; 78.99	23; 133.42
December 17–18, 2021	2022 Four National Championships	1; 59.78	6; 96.90	4; 156.68
December 6–12, 2021	2021 Santa Claus Cup	2; 56.88	2; 105.24	2; 162.12
November 3–7, 2021	2021 Volvo Open Cup	5; 51.77	7; 95.01	7; 146.78
October 14–17, 2021	2021 Budapest Trophy	8; 52.98	6; 87.70	6; 102.99
September 10–12, 2021	2021 CS Lombardia Trophy	7; 54.04	11; 103.62	9; 157.66
2020–2021 season
Date	Event	SP	FS	Total
February 25–28, 2021	2021 International Challenge Cup	12; 50.81	10; 93.09	11; 143.90
February 12–14, 2021	2021 Celje Open	3; 55.63	3; 107.61	3; 163.24
December 18–19, 2020	2021 Hungarian National Championships	2; 56.68	2; 100.03	2; 156.71
November 26–29, 2020	2020 Santa Claus Cup	8; 41.27	6; 91.68	5; 132.95
October 15–17, 2020	2020 CS Budapest Trophy	9; 46.49	9; 96.99	8; 143.48
2019–2020 season
Date	Event	SP	FS	Total
December 13–14, 2019	2020 Four National Championships	4; 50.98	3; 104.79	3P/2N; 155.77

=== Junior results ===
2019–2020 season
Date	Event	SP	FS	Total
2–8 March 2020	2020 World Junior Championships	19; 52.38	24; 74.17	24; 126.55
7–9 February 2020	2020 Hungarian Junior Championships	1; 53.89	1; 106.42	1; 160.31
10–15 January 2020	2020 Winter Youth Olympics – Team	-	6; 95.37	3T/6P
10–15 January 2020	2020 Winter Youth Olympics	11; 50.62	13; 91.20	12; 141.82
2–8 December 2019	2019 Santa Claus Cup	4; 43.79	1; 93.75	1; 137.54
22–24 November 2019	2019 Skate Celje	4; 45.03	2; 88.18	2; 133.21
31 October - 3 November 2019	2019 Tirnavia Ice Cup	1; 47.49	1; 92.66	1; 140.15
17–20 October 2019	2019 Halloween Cup	1; 48.68	1; 94.31	1; 142.99
4–7 September 2019	2019 JGP Latvia	14; 51.40	18; 82.10	15; 133.50
21–24 August 2019	2019 JGP France	22; 43.20	23; 79.29	23; 122.49
2018–2019 season
Date	Event	SP	FS	Total
10–14 April 2019	2019 Triglav Trophy	7; 40.57	6; 66.67	6; 107.24
15–17 February 2019	2019 Jégvirág Cup	1; 46.65	10; 55.67	7; 102.32
1–3 February 2019	2019 Hungarian Junior Championships	6; 38.05	3; 88.21	4; 126.26
17–19 January 2019	2019 Skate Helena	5; 47.13	7; 84.87	6; 132.00
14–16 December 2018	2018 Grand Prix of Bratislava	2; 49.41	1; 101.26	1; 150.67
29 November - 2 December 2018	2018 Christmas Cup	12; 37.09	3; 85.48	6; 122.57
6–11 November 2018	2018 Volvo Open Cup	3; 47.77	6; 90.23	5; 138.00
19–21 October 2018	2018 Halloween Cup	4; 46.09	2; 91.24	3; 137.33
26–29 September 2018	2018 JGP Czech Republic	19; 41.76	17; 77.33	17; 119.09
