= 2023 CS Denis Ten Memorial Challenge =

Figure skating competition

- Type: ISU Challenger Series
- Date: November 1 – 4
- Season: 2023–24
- Location: Astana, Kazakhstan
- Host: National Skating Federation of the Republic of Kazakhstan
- Venue: Barys Arena

Champions
- Men's singles: (South Korea) Lim Ju-heon
- Women's singles: (Israel) Mariia Seniuk
- Ice dance: (Georgia (country)) Diana Davis / Gleb Smolkin
- Previous: 2022 CS Denis Ten Memorial Challenge
- Next: 2024 CS Denis Ten Memorial Challenge
- Previous CS: 2023 CS Budapest Trophy
- Next CS: 2023 CS Warsaw Cup

The 2023 CS Denis Ten Memorial Challenge was held on November 1–4, 2023, in Astana, Kazakhstan. It was part of the 2023–24 ISU Challenger Series. Medals were awarded in men's singles, women's singles, and ice dance.

== Entries ==
The International Skating Union published the list of entries on October 17, 2023.

Country	Men	Women	Ice dance
Armenia	Fedor Chitipakhovian; Semen Daniliants		Viktoriia Azroian / Artur Gruzdev
Australia		Maria Chernyshova	
Azerbaijan			Adrienne Carhart / Oleksandr Kolosovskyi
Belgium		Jade Hovine	
Brazil			Natalia Pallu-Neves / Jayin Panesar
Czech Republic		Eliška Březinová	
Estonia	Arlet Levandi	Kristina Lisovskaja	
Finland	Valtter Virtanen		
France	Samy Hammi		
Georgia	Nika Egadze	Alina Urushadze	Diana Davis / Gleb Smolkin
Germany	Nikita Starostin		Jennifer Janse van Rensburg / Benjamin Steffan; Karla Maria Karl / Kai Hoferichter
Hungary			Mariia Ignateva / Danijil Szemko
Israel		Mariia Seniuk	
Kazakhstan	Dias Jirenbayev	Amina Alexeyeva; Sofiya Farafonova; Anna Levkovets; Russalina Shakrova; Nuriya Suleimen	
Poland			Sofiia Dovhal / Wiktor Kulesza; Anastasia Polibina / Pavel Golovishnikov
Serbia		Antonina Dubinina	
South Korea	Kim Han-gil; Lim Ju-heon	Choi Da-bin; Yun Ah-sun	
Sweden			Milla Ruud Reitan / Nikolaj Majorov
Turkey	Burak Demirboğa; Başar Oktar		
Ukraine	Kyrylo Marsak		Zoe Larson / Andrii Kapran; Mariia Pinchuk / Mykyta Pogorielov
Uzbekistan		Niginabonu Jamoliddinova	

== Changes to preliminary assignments ==
Date	Discipline	Withdrew	Added	Notes	Ref.
October 24	Women	(Estonia) Eva-Lotta Kiibus	—N/a		
October 24	Ice dance	(France) Lou Terreaux / Noé Perron	—N/a		
October 24	Ice dance	(Israel) Shira Ichilov / Dmitriy Kravchenko	—N/a		
October 24	Ice dance	(Israel) Mariia Nosovitskaya / Mikhail Nosovitskiy	—N/a		
October 26	Men	(France) Xan Rols	—N/a		
October 26	Men	(Kazakhstan) Rakhat Bralin	—N/a		
October 26	Women	(Czech Republic) Nikola Rychtaříková	—N/a		
October 26	Women	(Moldova) Anastasia Gracheva	—N/a		
October 26	Ice dance	(Finland) Yuka Orihara / Juho Pirinen	—N/a		
October 31	Men	(Czech Republic) Petr Kotlařik	—N/a	Injury	
October 31	Men	(Israel) Lev Vinokur	—N/a		
October 31	Women	(Israel) Elizabet Gervits	—N/a		
October 31	Ice dance	—N/a	(Poland) Sofiia Dovhal / Wiktor Kulesza		
November 1	Women	(Estonia) Olesja Leonova	—N/a		
November 3	Women	(South Korea) Kim Min-chae	—N/a		

== Results ==
=== Men's singles ===
Rank	Skater	Nation	Total points	SP		FS	
1st place, gold medalist(s)	Lim Ju-heon	South Korea	234.86	2	76.52	1	158.34
2nd place, silver medalist(s)	Nika Egadze	Georgia	234.82	1	83.95	2	150.87
3rd place, bronze medalist(s)	Kim Han-gil	South Korea	217.31	4	74.25	3	143.06
4	Arlet Levandi	Estonia	216.12	3	74.47	6	141.65
5	Semen Daniliants	Armenia	212.07	6	70.08	5	141.99
6	Samy Hammi	France	209.71	8	66.83	4	142.88
7	Nikita Starostin	Germany	205.90	7	70.08	7	135.72
8	Valtter Virtanen	Finland	200.83	9	65.74	8	135.09
9	Burak Demirboğa	Turkey	182.95	12	64.99	10	117.96
10	Fedor Chitipakhovian	Armenia	182.14	11	65.46	11	116.70
11	Kyrylo Marsak	Ukraine	172.64	5	72.31	13	100.33
12	Başar Oktar	Turkey	171.60	10	65.72	12	101.88
13	Dias Jirenbayev	Kazakhstan	168.77	13	50.54	9	118.23

=== Women's singles ===
Rank	Skater	Nation	Total points	SP		FS	
1st place, gold medalist(s)	Mariia Seniuk	Israel	175.75	3	58.28	1	117.47
2nd place, silver medalist(s)	Choi Da-bin	South Korea	171.00	1	59.70	2	111.30
3rd place, bronze medalist(s)	Alina Urushadze	Georgia	166.62	2	58.80	3	107.82
4	Kristina Lisovskaja	Estonia	158.09	4	57.08	4	107.82
5	Jade Hovine	Belgium	154.51	5	54.79	5	99.72
6	Eliška Březinová	Czech Republic	143.09	9	47.22	6	95.87
7	Sofiya Farafonova	Kazakhstan	139.74	7	51.51	7	88.23
8	Nuriya Suleimen	Kazakhstan	134.94	8	49.63	9	85.31
9	Anna Levkovets	Kazakhstan	133.14	10	46.63	8	86.51
10	Yun Ah-sun	South Korea	130.69	12	45.91	10	84.78
11	Maria Chernyshova	Australia	128.91	6	54.22	12	74.69
12	Niginabonu Jamoliddinova	Uzbekistan	115.12	13	38.83	11	76.29
13	Antonina Dubinina	Serbia	113.96	11	46.22	14	67.74
14	Amina Alexeyeva	Kazakhstan	106.42	14	31.84	13	74.58
15	Russalina Shakrova	Kazakhstan	93.44	15	31.70	15	61.74
WD	Kim Min-chae	South Korea	withdrew from competition				

=== Ice dance ===
Rank	Team	Nation	Total points	RD		FD	
1st place, gold medalist(s)	Diana Davis / Gleb Smolkin	Georgia	192.67	1	76.56	1	116.11
2nd place, silver medalist(s)	Jennifer Janse van Rensburg / Benjamin Steffan	Germany	179.42	2	69.81	2	109.61
3rd place, bronze medalist(s)	Mariia Pinchuk / Mykyta Pogorielov	Ukraine	167.22	6	61.48	3	105.74
4	Milla Ruud Reitan / Nikolaj Majorov	Sweden	160.76	5	62.94	4	97.82
5	Zoe Larson / Andrii Kapran	Ukraine	154.36	3	63.05	5	91.31
6	Adrienne Carhart / Oleksandr Kolosovskyi	Azerbaijan	150.19	4	62.97	8	87.22
7	Sofiia Dovhal / Wiktor Kulesza	Poland	147.72	9	58.55	6	89.17
8	Mariia Ignateva / Danijil Szemko	Hungary	147.16	8	59.53	7	87.63
9	Anastasia Polibina / Pavel Golovishnikov	Poland	146.01	7	59.93	10	87.22
10	Karla Maria Karl / Kai Hoferichter	Germany	140.81	10	54.40	9	86.41
11	Natalia Pallu-Neves / Jayin Panesar	Brazil	131.59	11	53.17	11	86.41
WD	Viktoriia Azroian / Artur Gruzdev	Armenia	withdrew	12	49.23	withdrew from competition	
