= 2022 CS Denis Ten Memorial Challenge =

Figure skating competition

- Type: ISU Challenger Series
- Date: October 26 – 29
- Season: 2022–23
- Location: Almaty, Kazakhstan
- Host: National Skating Federation of the Republic of Kazakhstan
- Venue: Halyk Arena

Champions
- Men's singles: (Georgia (country)) Nika Egadze
- Women's singles: (South Korea) Kim Min-chae
- Ice dance: (Japan) Kana Muramoto / Daisuke Takahashi
- Previous: 2021 CS Denis Ten Memorial Challenge
- Next: 2023 CS Denis Ten Memorial Challenge
- Previous CS: 2022 CS Budapest Trophy
- Next CS: 2022 CS Ice Challenge

The 2022 CS Denis Ten Memorial Challenge was held on October 26–29, 2022, in Almaty, Kazakhstan. It was the seventh event of the 2022–23 ISU Challenger Series. Medals were awarded in men's singles, women's singles, and ice dance.

== Entries ==
The International Skating Union published the list of entries on October 3, 2022.

Country	Men	Women	Ice dance
Armenia	Semen Daniliants		Viktoriia Azroian / Artur Gruzdev
Azerbaijan	Vladimir Litvintsev		Adrienne Carhart / Oleksandr Kolosovskyi
Bulgaria		Alexandra Feigin; Kristina Grigorova	
Georgia	Nika Egadze		
Germany			Jennifer Janse van Rensburg / Benjamin Steffan; Lara Luft / Maximilian Pfisterer
Hungary			Lucy Hancock / Ilias Fourati; Mariia Ignateva / Danijil Szemko
Japan			Kana Muramoto / Daisuke Takahashi
Kazakhstan	Rakhat Bralin; Dias Jirenbayev; Oleg Melnikov; Yelissey Volkov	Sofiya Farafonova; Anna Levkovets; Yeva Nabozhenko; Bagdana Rakhishova; Yasmin Tekik	Gaukhar Nauryzova / Boyisangur Datiev
Kyrgyzstan		Alexandra Nesterova	
Moldova		Anastasia Gracheva	
Poland	Kornel Witkowski		
Serbia		Antonina Dubinina	
South Korea		Choi Da-bin; Kim Min-chae	
Ukraine			Zoe Larson / Andrii Kapran

=== Changes to preliminary assignments ===
Date	Discipline	Withdrew	Added	Ref.
October 12	Men	(Italy) Raffaele Francesco Zich	(Azerbaijan) Vladimir Litvintsev	
October 12	Men	—N/a	(Uzbekistan) Azizmurod Shabazov	
October 12	Women	—N/a	(Kazakhstan) Yeva Nabozhenko	
October 19	Men	(France) Luc Economides	—N/a	
October 19	Men	(Israel) Mark Gorodnitsky	—N/a	
October 19	Women	(Israel) Ella Chen	(Serbia) Antonina Dubinina	
October 19	Women	(Israel) Mariia Seniuk	—N/a	
October 19	Ice dance	(Israel) Mariia Nosovitskaya / Mikhail Nosovitskiy	(Germany) Jennifer Janse van Rensburg / Benjamin Steffan	
October 19	Ice dance	(Israel) Elizabeth Tkachenko / Alexei Kiliakov	—N/a	
October 24	Men	(Uzbekistan) Azizmurod Shabazov	—N/a	
October 25	Men	(Kazakhstan) Nikita Krivosheyev	(Poland) Kornel Witkowski	

== Results ==
=== Men's singles ===
Rank	Skater	Nation	Total points	SP		FS	
1st place, gold medalist(s)	Nika Egadze	Georgia	208.47	1	71.81	1	136.66
2nd place, silver medalist(s)	Dias Jirenbayev	Kazakhstan	192.67	2	68.52	4	124.15
3rd place, bronze medalist(s)	Vladimir Litvintsev	Azerbaijan	188.77	3	64.00	3	124.77
4	Rakhat Bralin	Kazakhstan	181.22	4	62.47	5	118.75
5	Kornel Witkowski	Poland	179.50	7	47.23	2	132.27
6	Oleg Melnikov	Kazakhstan	162.30	5	57.62	6	104.68
7	Semen Daniliants	Armenia	158.21	6	55.62	7	102.59
8	Yelissey Volkov	Kazakhstan	101.96	8	46.82	8	55.14

=== Women's singles ===
Rank	Skater	Nation	Total points	SP		FS	
1st place, gold medalist(s)	Kim Min-chae	South Korea	158.84	7	41.05	1	117.79
2nd place, silver medalist(s)	Anna Levkovets	Kazakhstan	145.43	1	54.16	3	91.27
3rd place, bronze medalist(s)	Choi Da-bin	South Korea	145.06	3	49.76	2	95.30
4	Alexandra Feigin	Bulgaria	140.96	2	50.11	4	90.85
5	Anastasia Gracheva	Moldova	132.66	4	47.36	5	85.30
6	Kristina Grigorova	Bulgaria	128.91	5	45.66	6	83.25
7	Sofiya Farafonova	Kazakhstan	122.51	8	40.63	7	81.88
8	Antonina Dubinina	Serbia	118.98	6	44.42	8	74.56
9	Bagdana Rakhishova	Kazakhstan	111.88	9	38.16	9	73.72
10	Yasmin Tekik	Kazakhstan	105.70	10	33.02	10	72.68
11	Aleksandra Nesterova	Kyrgyzstan	79.05	11	28.90	11	50.15
WD	Yeva Nabozhenko	Kazakhstan	withdrew from competition				

=== Ice dance ===
Rank	Team	Nation	Total points	RD		FD	
1st place, gold medalist(s)	Kana Muramoto / Daisuke Takahashi	Japan	188.30	1	79.56	1	108.74
2nd place, silver medalist(s)	Jennifer Janse van Rensburg / Benjamin Steffan	Germany	177.91	2	72.15	2	105.76
3rd place, bronze medalist(s)	Mariia Ignateva / Danijil Szemko	Hungary	174.23	3	70.20	3	104.03
4	Lara Luft / Maximilian Pfisterer	Germany	152.16	4	60.48	4	91.68
5	Lucy Hancock / Ilias Fourati	Hungary	148.75	5	59.42	6	89.33
6	Adrienne Carhart / Oleksandr Kolosovskyi	Azerbaijan	148.57	6	57.01	5	91.56
7	Gaukhar Nauryzova / Boyisangur Datiev	Kazakhstan	145.12	7	56.47	7	88.65
8	Viktoriia Azroian / Artur Gruzdev	Armenia	138.52	9	53.03	8	85.49
9	Zoe Larson / Andrii Kapran	Ukraine	135.18	8	55.69	9	79.49
