= 2023 CS Lombardia Trophy =

Figure skating competition in Bergamo, Italy

- Type: ISU Challenger Series
- Date: September 8 – 10
- Season: 2023–24
- Location: Bergamo, Italy
- Host: Federazione Italiana Sport del Ghiaccio
- Venue: IceLab Bergamo Palaghiaccio

Champions
- Men's singles: (Japan) Yuma Kagiyama
- Women's singles: (Georgia (country)) Anastasiia Gubanova
- Pairs: (Italy) Sara Conti / Niccolò Macii
- Ice dance: (Italy) Charlène Guignard / Marco Fabbri
- Previous: 2022 CS Lombardia Trophy
- Next: 2024 CS Lombardia Trophy
- Next CS: 2023 CS Autumn Classic International

The 2023 CS Lombardia Trophy Memorial Anna Grandolfi was held on September 8–10, 2023, in Bergamo, Italy. It was part of the 2023–24 ISU Challenger Series. Medals were awarded in men's singles, women's singles, pair skating, and ice dance.

== Entries ==
The International Skating Union published the list of entries on August 14, 2023.

Country	Men	Women	Pairs	Ice dance
Belgium		Nina Pinzarrone		
Brazil				Natalia Pallu-Neves / Jayin Panesar
Czech Republic	Georgii Reshtenko		Barbora Kuciánová / Martin Bidař	Kateřina Mrázková / Daniel Mrázek; Natálie Taschlerová / Filip Taschler
Estonia	Arlet Levandi	Niina Petrõkina		
Finland	Makar Suntsev	Janna Jyrkinen	Milania Väänänen / Filippo Clerici	
France	Landry Le May		Aurélie Faula / Théo Belle; Océane Piegad / Denys Strekalin	
Georgia	Nika Egadze	Anastasiia Gubanova; Alina Urushadze		Maria Kazakova / Georgy Reviya
Germany	Nikita Starostin		Minerva Fabienne Hase / Nikita Volodin; Annika Hocke / Robert Kunkel	Charise Matthaei / Max Liebers
Great Britain			Anastasia Vaipan-Law / Luke Digby	
Italy		Lara Naki Gutmann	Lucrezia Beccari / Matteo Guarise; Sara Conti / Niccolò Macii; Rebecca Ghilardi / Filippo Ambrosini	Leia Dozzi / Pietro Papetti; Giorgia Galimberti / Matteo Libasse Mandelli; Charlène Guignard / Marco Fabbri; Victoria Manni / Carlo Röthlisberger
Japan	Yuma Kagiyama; Nozomu Yoshioka	Hana Yoshida		
Latvia		Angelīna Kučvaļska		
Netherlands			Daria Danilova / Michel Tsiba	
Norway		Mia Risa Gomez		
Poland	Kornel Witkowski; Miłosz Witkowski	Ekaterina Kurakova		Olivia Oliver / Filip Bojanowski
Slovakia				Mária Sofia Pucherová / Nikita Lysak; Anna Šimová / Kirill Aksenov
South Korea		Kim Chae-yeon; Kim Seo-young; Yun Ah-sun		
Ukraine	Andrii Kokura			Zoe Larson / Andrii Kapran
United States	Camden Pulkinen; Andrew Torgashev	Ava Marie Ziegler		Emily Bratti / Ian Somerville; Caroline Green / Michael Parsons

=== Changes to preliminary assignments ===
Date	Discipline	Withdrew	Ref.
August 17	Men	(France) Corentin Spinar	
August 21	Women	(Slovakia) Ema Doboszová	
August 21	Women	(Slovenia) Julija Lovrenčič	
August 21	Pairs	(Netherlands) Nika Osipova / Dmitry Epstein	
September 1	Men	(Italy) Daniel Grassl	
September 1	Men	(Italy) Matteo Rizzo	
September 1	Women	(Hungary) Dária Zsirnov	
September 5	Men	(Israel) Lev Vinokur	

== Results ==
=== Men's singles ===
Rank	Skater	Nation	Total points	SP		FS	
1st place, gold medalist(s)	Yuma Kagiyama	Japan	265.59	1	91.47	1	174.12
2nd place, silver medalist(s)	Nika Egadze	Georgia	243.35	3	78.75	2	164.60
3rd place, bronze medalist(s)	Andrew Torgashev	United States	233.26	2	86.41	4	146.85
4	Camden Pulkinen	United States	210.46	8	62.96	3	147.50
5	Nozomu Yoshioka	Japan	210.46	4	70.07	5	140.39
6	Nikita Starostin	Germany	198.32	5	69.30	6	129.02
7	Landry Le May	France	189.75	6	66.01	7	123.74
8	Arlet Levandi	Estonia	185.73	7	64.75	10	120.98
9	Georgii Reshtenko	Czech Republic	183.87	9	60.85	8	123.02
10	Miłosz Witkowski	Poland	160.89	11	50.42	9	122.24
11	Kornel Witkowski	Poland	151.68	12	47.17	11	110.47
12	Andrii Kokura	Ukraine	151.68	10	55.23	13	96.45
13	Makar Suntsev	Finland	151.39	13	43.42	12	107.19

=== Women's singles ===
Rank	Skater	Nation	Total points	SP		FS	
1st place, gold medalist(s)	Anastasiia Gubanova	Georgia	185.60	1	69.65	4	115.95
2nd place, silver medalist(s)	Hana Yoshida	Japan	185.45	3	62.54	1	122.91
3rd place, bronze medalist(s)	Kim Chae-yeon	South Korea	180.78	2	63.27	2	117.51
4	Ekaterina Kurakova	Poland	178.62	4	62.00	3	116.62
5	Lara Naki Gutmann	Italy	163.42	8	53.96	5	109.46
6	Ava Marie Ziegler	United States	157.39	5	60.26	10	97.13
7	Niina Petrõkina	Estonia	156.93	6	55.21	8	101.72
8	Kim Seo-young	South Korea	156.38	9	53.71	7	102.67
9	Nina Pinzarrone	Belgium	155.43	12	47.41	6	108.02
10	Alina Urushadze	Georgia	152.69	7	54.11	9	98.49
11	Janna Jyrkinen	Finland	145.11	10	53.62	11	91.49
12	Yun Ah-sun	South Korea	132.04	14	45.46	12	86.58
13	Mia Risa Gomez	Norway	129.53	13	46.50	13	83.03
14	Angelīna Kučvaļska	Latvia	122.87	11	48.87	14	74.00

=== Pairs ===
Rank	Team	Nation	Total points	SP		FS	
1st place, gold medalist(s)	Sara Conti / Niccolò Macii	Italy	200.35	1	70.16	1	130.19
2nd place, silver medalist(s)	Minerva Fabienne Hase / Nikita Volodin	Germany	194.52	3	66.22	2	128.30
3rd place, bronze medalist(s)	Annika Hocke / Robert Kunkel	Germany	191.76	4	66.06	4	125.70
4	Lucrezia Beccari / Matteo Guarise	Italy	185.06	2	66.94	5	118.12
5	Rebecca Ghilardi / Filippo Ambrosini	Italy	182.33	7	54.99	3	127.34
6	Daria Danilova / Michel Tsiba	Netherlands	160.47	8	53.58	6	106.89
7	Milania Väänänen / Filippo Clerici	Finland	151.50	5	55.99	7	95.51
8	Anastasia Vaipan-Law / Luke Digby	Great Britain	142.97	6	55.32	10	87.65
9	Barbora Kuciánová / Martin Bidař	Czech Republic	142.65	10	50.79	8	91.86
10	Océane Piegad / Denys Strekalin	France	141.12	9	52.01	9	89.11
11	Aurelie Faula / Theo Belle	France	115.26	11	41.32	11	73.94

=== Ice dance ===
Rank	Team	Nation	Total points	RD		FD	
1st place, gold medalist(s)	Charlene Guignard / Marco Fabbri	Italy	208.02	1	84.61	1	123.41
2nd place, silver medalist(s)	Natálie Taschlerová / Filip Taschler	Czech Republic	189.23	2	75.21	2	114.02
3rd place, bronze medalist(s)	Maria Kazakova / Georgy Reviya	Georgia	180.99	3	70.95	4	110.04
4	Emily Bratti / Ian Somerville	United States	177.66	5	68.19	5	109.47
5	Kateřina Mrázková / Daniel Mrazek	Czech Republic	177.43	6	67.31	3	110.12
6	Caroline Green / Michael Parsons	United States	168.56	4	68.44	7	100.12
7	Victoria Manni / Carlo Röthlisberger	Italy	160.90	7	60.41	6	100.49
8	Leia Dozzi / Pietro Papetti	Italy	154.30	8	58.22	8	96.08
9	Charise Matthaei / Max Liebers	Germany	153.04	9	57.50	9	95.54
10	Anna Šimová / Kirill Aksenov	Slovakia	146.03	10	55.83	10	90.20
11	Maria Sofia Pucherová / Nikita Lysak	Slovakia	134.87	12	50.55	11	84.32
12	Olivia Oliver / Filip Bojanowski	Poland	132.96	11	54.23	13	78.73
13	Giorgia Galimberti / Matteo Libasse Mandelli	Italy	128.25	13	48.38	12	79.87
14	Zoe Larson / Andrii Kapran	Ukraine	124.14	14	47.76	14	76.38
15	Natalia Pallu-Neves / Jayin Panesar	Brazil	119.02	13	46.49	15	72.53
