= Dias Jirenbayev =

Kazakhstani figure skater (born 2003)

Personal information
- Native name: Диас Ержанұлы Жиренбаев
- Full name: Dias Erzhanovich Jirenbayev
- Born: 3 October 2003 (age 23) Taraz, Kazakhstan
- Height: 1.80 m (5 ft 11 in)

Figure skating career
- Country: Kazakhstan
- Discipline: Men's singles
- Coach: Oksana Ten
- Skating club: Denis Ten Academy
- Began skating: 2012

Medal record
Kazakh Championships
Gold medal – first place	2025 Karaganda	Singles
Silver medal – second place	2021 Almaty	Singles
Silver medal – second place	2022 Almaty	Singles
Silver medal – second place	2023 Astana	Singles
Silver medal – second place	2026 Pavlodar	Singles
Bronze medal – third place	2020 Almaty	Singles
Bronze medal – third place	2024 Almaty	Singles

Dias Erjanūly Jirenbaev (Note: Often transliterated as Diyas Yerzhanovich Zhirenbayev through a Russified Romanization of Диас Ержанович Жиренбаев.) (also Jirenbayev; Kazakh: Диас Ержанұлы Жиренбаев; born 3 October 2003) is a Kazakh figure skater. He is the 2022 CS Denis Ten Memorial Challenge silver medalist, 2024 Coupe du Printemps champion, 2022 Denkova-Staviski Cup bronze medalist, 2022 Sofia Trophy bronze medalist, and the 2025 Kazakhstan senior champion.

== Personal life ==
Jirenbayev was born on 3 October 2003 in Taraz, Kazakhstan. He and his family eventually moved to Astana.

He is currently a student at the Kazakh Academy of Sports & Tourism.

== Career ==
=== Early career ===
Jirenbayev began figure skating in 2012 at the age of nine. He initially trained at the Astana Palace of School Children, where he was coached by Vladimir Victorovich Rudi. In addition, Svetlana Chernikova also coached him during his childhood.

=== 2019–20 season ===
Prior to the season, Jirenbayev left the Astana Palace of School Children and began training at the Astana Diamond Skates instead. It was there where Aygul Shavaleeva and Georgi Klochko would become his new coaches. Debuting on the 2019–20 ISU Junior Grand Prix circuit, he finished fifteenth at 2019 JGP Russia. He then competed on the junior level at the 2019 Denis Ten Memorial Challenge.

=== 2020–21 season ===
He did not compete internationally during the 2020–21 figure skating season due to the 2020–21 ISU Junior Grand Prix circuit being cancelled as a result of the ongoing COVID-19 pandemic.

=== 2021–22 season: Senior international debut ===
Prior to the start of the season, the Denis Ten Academy was founded and Jirenbayev decided to transfer on over to the new skating club. Former Russian figure skater, Sergei Voronov, who had been appointed to head coach of the club, became Jirenbayev's new coach.

He began the season by competing on the 2021–22 ISU Junior Grand Prix circuit, finishing ninth at 2021 JGP Slovakia.

Due to Kazakhstan having no Olympic berths obtained during the 2021 World Championships, Jirenbayev was sent to compete at the 2021 CS Nebelhorn Trophy, the final qualifying event for the 2022 Winter Olympics. At the event, Jirenbayev placed twenty-seventh, failing to qualify a spot for Kazakhstani men's singles skaters at the 2022 Winter Olympics.

Jirenbayev went on to compete at the 2021 CS Denis Ten Memorial Challenge and the 2021 Santa Claus Cup, placing tenth and fifth, respectively. Selected to compete at the 2022 Four Continents Championships in Tallinn, Estonia, Jirenbayev finished thirteenth at the event. He then closed the season by winning bronze at the 2022 Sofia Trophy.

=== 2022–23 season: Challenger Series silver ===
Jirenbayev started the season by competing on the 2022–23 ISU Junior Grand Prix circuit, finishing ninth at 2022 JGP Italy. He subsequently competed on the 2022–23 ISU Challenger Series, finishing second at the 2022 CS Denis Ten Memorial Challenge and ninth at the 2022 CS Golden Spin of Zagreb. Between the two events, Jirenbayev also won the bronze medal at the 2022 Denkova-Staviski Cup.

Selected to compete at the 2023 Winter World University Games, Jirenbayev placed eleventh at the event. One month later, he competed at the 2023 Four Continents Championships in Colorado Springs, Colorado, United States, where he finished sixteenth. He then closed the season with a sixteenth-place finish at the 2023 World Junior Championships in Calgary, Alberta, Canada.

Following the season, Jirenbayev's coach, Sergei Voronov, made the decision to resign as head coach of the Denis Ten Academy. As such, Oksana Ten, mother of the late Denis Ten and the then vice-president of the National Skating Federation of the Republic of Kazakhstan, became Jirenbayev's new coach.

=== 2023–24 season ===
Beginning the season by competing on the 2023–24 ISU Challenger Series, Jirenbayev finished twelfth at the 2023 CS Budapest Trophy, thirteenth at the 2023 CS Denis Ten Memorial Challenge, and sixteenth at the 2023 CS Warsaw Cup. He then finished fourth at the 2023 Volvo Open Cup.

Selected to compete at the 2024 Four Continents Championships in Shanghai, China, Jirenbayev placed sixteenth at the event. He then concluded the season by winning gold at the 2024 Coupe du Printemps.

=== 2024–25 season: Kazakhstani national title ===
Jirenbayev started the season with a ninth-place finish at the 2024 Asian Open Trophy. He subsequently competed on the 2024–25 ISU Challenger Series, finishing fifteenth at the 2024 CS Nebelhorn Trophy, ninth at the 2024 CS Denis Ten Memorial Challenge, and thirteenth at the 2024 CS Nepela Memorial.

In mid-December, Jirenbayev won the gold medal at the 2025 Kazakhstani Championships. He then went on to place fourteenth at the 2025 Winter World University Games and ninth at the 2025 Asian Winter Games.

Jirenbayev subsequently finished the season by placing nineteenth at the 2025 Four Continents Championships in Seoul, South Korea.

=== 2025–26 season: World Championships debut ===
Jirenbayev opened the season by finishing sixth at the 2025 Asian Open Trophy.

In January, Jirenbayev competed at the 2026 Four Continents Championships – he finished in 20th place.

When Olympic champion Mikhail Shaidorov opted to withdraw from the 2026 World Championships, Jirenbayev was called up to compete in his place. He finished thirty-fifth in the short program and did not qualify for the free skating segment.

=== 2026–27 season ===
Jirenbayev began his season at home in Kazakhstan, at the 2026 CS Denis Ten Memorial Challenge; he placed ninth overall.

== Programs ==
Season	Short program	Free skating	Exhibition
2025–2026	Otoño Porteño (from Estaciones Porteñas) by Astor Piazzolla choreo. by Stéphane Lambiel	Elegie; Prelude in G minor by Sergei Rachmaninoff choreo. by Olga Orlova	My Song by Denis Ten
2024–2025	Mon cœur s'ouvre à ta voix (from Samson and Delilah) by Camille Saint-Saëns; I Belong to You by Muse choreo. by Olga Orlova	The Godfather by Nino Rota choreo. by Maxim Staviski	Ýaıymdama by ORYNKHAN
2023–2024	I Love You by Woodkid choreo. by Albena Denkova, Maxim Staviski	Chess by Benny Andersson & Björn Ulvaeus choreo. by Albena Denkova, Maxim Staviski	
2022–2023	Fever; Burning Love performed by Elvis Presley choreo. by Elena Radionova	Piano Concerto No. 2 by Sergei Rachmaninoff choreo. by Sergei Voronov	
2021–2022	Ne me quitte pas by Jacques Brel	Home by Armand Amar	
2019–2020	Iron Sky by Paolo Nutini choreo. by Aigul Shavaleyeeva	Friend Like Me (from Aladdin) performed by James Monroe Iglehart and Adam Jacobs choreo. by Aigul Shavaleyeeva	
2018-2019	Masquerade Waltz by Khachaturian	Game of Thrones performed by 2Cellos	

== Competitive highlights ==
- JGP – Event of the ISU Junior Grand Prix Series
- CS – Event of the ISU Challenger Series
- TBD – Assigned
- WD – Withdrew from competition

Competition placements at senior level
Season	2018-19	2019–20	2020–21	2021–22	2022–23	2023–24	2024–25	2025–26	2026–27
World Championships								35th	
Four Continents Championships				13th	16th	16th	19th	20th	
Kazakh Championships	3rd	3rd	2nd	2nd	2nd	3rd	1st	2nd	
CS Budapest Trophy						12th			
CS Denis Ten Memorial				10th	2nd	13th	9th	11th	9th
CS Golden Spin of Zagreb					9th				
CS Nebelhorn Trophy				27th			15th		
CS Nepela Memorial							13th		
CS Warsaw Cup						16th		17th	
Asian Games							9th		
Asian Open Trophy							9th	6th	
Coupe du Printemps						1st			
Denkova-Staviski Cup					3rd				
NRW Trophy								4th	
Santa Claus Cup				5th					
Skate to Milano								14th	
Sofia Trophy				3rd					
Volvo Open Cup						4th			
World University Games					11th		14th		

Competition placements at junior level
Season	2016–17	2017–18	2018–19	2019–20	2021–22	2022–23
World Junior Championships						16th
Kazakh Championships	2nd	1st				
JGP Italy						9th
JGP Russia				15th		
JGP Slovakia					9th	
Challenge Cup		11th				
Children of Asia Games			11th			
Christmas Cup			3rd			
Denis Ten Memorial				6th		

== Detailed results ==
ISU personal best scores in the +5/-5 GOE System
Segment	Type	Score	Event
Total	TSS	208.68	2025 CS Denis Ten Memorial Challenge
Short program	TSS	77.14	2025 CS Denis Ten Memorial Challenge
Short program	TES	40.91	2025 CS Denis Ten Memorial Challenge
Short program	PCS	37.49	2026 CS Denis Ten Memorial Challenge
Free skating	TSS	131.97	2024 CS Denis Ten Memorial Challenge
Free skating	TES	62.89	2021 CS Denis Ten Memorial Challenge
Free skating	PCS	73.94	2025 CS Denis Ten Memorial Challenge

=== Senior Level ===
Results in the 2021-22 season
Date	Event	SP		FS		Total	
Date	Event	P	Score	P	Score	P	Score
Sep 21-25, 2021	(Germany) 2021 CS Nebelhorn Trophy	28	52.81	26	103.48	27	156.29
Oct 27-31, 2021	(Kazakhstan) 2021 CS Denis Ten Memorial Challenge	11	52.63	8	126.39	10	179.02
Dec 6-12, 2021	(Hungary) 2021 Santa Claus Cup	5	58.42	6	113.47	5	171.89
Jan 17-22, 2022	(Estonia) 2022 Four Continents Championships	12	66.92	13	126.00	13	192.92
Feb 1-6, 2022	(Bulgaria) 2022 Sofia Trophy	3	67.26	4	123.55	3	190.81

Results in the 2022-23 season
Date	Event	SP		FS		Total	
Date	Event	P	Score	P	Score	P	Score
Oct 26-29, 2022	(Kazakhstan) 2022 CS Denis Ten Memorial Challenge	2	68.52	4	124.15	2	192.67
Nov 1-6, 2022	(Bulgaria) 2022 Denkova-Staviski Cup	3	66.48	2	120.36	3	186.84
Dec 7-10, 2022	(Croatia) 2022 CS Golden Spin of Zagreb	10	56.19	9	124.12	9	180.31
Jan 12-16, 2023	(United States) 2023 Winter World University Games	16	60.89	9	135.52	11	196.41
Feb 7-12, 2023	(United States) 2023 Four Continents Championships	18	57.67	15	125.75	16	183.42

Results in the 2023-24 season
Date	Event	SP		FS		Total	
Date	Event	P	Score	P	Score	P	Score
Oct 13-15, 2023	(Hungary) 2023 CS Budapest Trophy	18	54.67	10	127.97	12	182.64
Nov 2-5, 2023	(Kazakhstan) 2023 CS Denis Ten Memorial Challenge	13	50.54	9	118.23	13	168.77
Nov 16-19, 2023	(Poland) 2023 CS Warsaw Cup	16	60.22	17	119.96	16	180.18
Jan 18-21, 2024	(Latvia) 51st Volvo Open Cup	6	51.42	3	122.23	4	173.65
Feb 1-4, 2024	(China) 2024 Four Continents Championships	18	64.51	16	131.37	16	195.88
Mar 15-17, 2024	(Luxembourg) 2024 Coupe du Printemps	1	70.64	1	141.12	1	211.76

Results in the 2024–25 season
Date	Event	SP		FS		Total	
Date	Event	P	Score	P	Score	P	Score
Sep 2-6, 2024	(Hong Kong) 2024 Asian Open Trophy	8	68.43	9	117.84	9	186.27
Sep 19-21, 2024	(Germany) 2024 CS Nebelhorn Trophy	11	69.60	17	114.37	15	183.97
Oct 3-5, 2024	(Kazakhstan) 2024 CS Denis Ten Memorial Challenge	7	65.69	9	131.97	9	197.66
Oct 25-27, 2024	(Slovakia) 2024 CS Nepela Memorial	10	64.33	13	98.67	13	163.00
Dec 13-16, 2024	(Kazakhstan) 2025 Kazakh Championships	1	66.98	1	133.65	1	200.63
Jan 16–18, 2025	(Italy) 2025 Winter World University Games	17	62.28	14	123.81	14	186.09
Feb 19-23, 2025	(South Korea) 2025 Four Continents Championships	20	52.97	19	113.37	19	166.34

Results in the 2025–26 season
Date	Event	SP		FS		Total	
Date	Event	P	Score	P	Score	P	Score
Aug 1–5, 2025	(Philippines) 2025 Asian Open Trophy	11	51.29	5	127.38	6	178.67
Sep 18-21, 2025	(China) 2025 ISU Skate to Milano	15	64.92	13	124.22	14	189.14
Oct 1-4, 2025	(Kazakhstan) 2025 CS Denis Ten Memorial Challenge	7	77.14	12	131.54	11	208.68
Nov 13-16, 2025	(Germany) 2025 NRW Trophy	3	71.48	4	138.68	4	210.16
Nov 19–23, 2025	(Poland) 2025 CS Warsaw Cup	7	66.90	18	109.43	17	176.13
Dec 12–15, 2025	(Kazakhstan) 2026 Kazakh Championships	3	64.70	2	131.14	2	195.84
Jan 21–25, 2026	(China) 2026 Four Continents Championships	19	63.90	20	121.53	20	185.43
Mar 24–29, 2026	(Czech Republic) 2026 World Championships	35	59.34	—N/a	—N/a	35	59.34

Results in the 2026-27 season
Date	Event	SP		FS		Total	
Date	Event	P	Score	P	Score	P	Score
Oct 8–11, 2026	(Kazakhstan) 2026 CS Denis Ten Memorial Challenge	7	66.11	9	120.16	9	186.27

=== Junior Level ===
Results in the 2017-18 season
Date	Event	SP		FS		Total	
Date	Event	P	Score	P	Score	P	Score
Feb 23-25, 2018	(Netherlands) 2018 International Challenge Cup	8	44.41	11	66.44	11	110.85

Results in the 2018-19 season
Date	Event	SP		FS		Total	
Date	Event	P	Score	P	Score	P	Score
Nov 29-Dec 2, 2018	(Hungary) 2018 Christmas Cup	3	47.51	3	87.29	3	134.80
Feb 13-15, 2019	(Russia) 2019 Winter Children of Asia International Games	11	44.68	11	91.87	11	136.55

Results in the 2019-20 season
Date	Event	SP		FS		Total	
Date	Event	P	Score	P	Score	P	Score
Sep 11-14, 2019	2019 JGP Russia	11	58.16	17	88.77	15	146.93
Oct 9-12, 2019	(Kazakhstan) 2019 Denis Ten Memorial Challenge	4	59.12	6	106.40	6	165.52

Results in the 2021-22 season
Date	Event	SP		FS		Total	
Date	Event	P	Score	P	Score	P	Score
Sep 1-4, 2021	2021 JGP Slovakia	12	55.47	9	113.50	9	168.97

Results in the 2022-23 season
Date	Event	SP		FS		Total	
Date	Event	P	Score	P	Score	P	Score
Oct 11-15, 2022	2022 JGP Italy	11	60.35	7	126.36	9	186.71
Feb 27-Mar 5, 2023	(Canada) 2023 World Junior Championships	22	59.77	16	123.09	16	182.86
