= 2024 CS Denis Ten Memorial Challenge =

Figure skating competition

- Type: ISU Challenger Series
- Date: October 3 – 6
- Season: 2024–25
- Location: Astana, Kazakhstan
- Host: National Skating Federation of the Republic of Kazakhstan
- Venue: Barys Arena

Champions
- Men's singles: (Kazakhstan) Mikhail Shaidorov
- Women's singles: (Georgia (country)) Anastasiia Gubanova
- Ice dance: (Czech Republic) Natálie Taschlerová and Filip Taschler
- Previous: 2023 CS Denis Ten Memorial Challenge
- Next: 2025 CS Denis Ten Memorial Challenge
- Previous CS: 2024 CS Nebelhorn Trophy
- Next CS: 2024 CS Budapest Trophy

The 2024 CS Denis Ten Memorial Challenge was held on October 3–6, 2024, in Astana, Kazakhstan. It was part of the 2024–25 ISU Challenger Series. Medals were awarded in men's singles, women's singles, and ice dance.

== Entries ==
The International Skating Union published the list of entries on August 19, 2024.

Country	Men	Women	Ice dance
Armenia	Semen Daniliants	—N/a	Kristina Dobroserdova; Alessandro Pellegrini
Azerbaijan	Vladimir Litvintsev	—N/a	Maxine Weatherby; Oleksandr Kolosovskyi
Brazil	—N/a		Natalia Pallu-Neves; Jayin Panesar
Bulgaria	—N/a	Alexandra Feigin	—N/a
Canada	Aleksa Rakic	Kaiya Ruiter	Alicia Fabbri; Paul Ayer
Canada	—N/a	Uliana Shiryaeva	Lily Hensen; Nathan Lickers
China	—N/a	Zhu Yi	—N/a
Czech Republic	—N/a	Eliška Březinová	Kateřina Mrázková; Daniel Mrázek
Czech Republic	—N/a	—N/a	Natálie Taschlerová; Filip Taschler
Finland	Valtter Virtanen	—N/a	Daniela Ivanitskiy; Matthew Sperry
France	—N/a		Marie Dupayage; Thomas Nabais
France	—N/a		Lou Terreaux; Noé Perron
Georgia	Nika Egadze	Anastasiia Gubanova	—N/a
Great Britain	—N/a		Phebe Bekker; James Hernandez
Hungary	—N/a		Lucy Hancock; Ilias Fourati
Israel	—N/a	Viktoriia Iushchenkova	—N/a
Israel	—N/a	Mariia Seniuk	—N/a
Italy	Daniel Grassl	Lara Naki Gutmann	—N/a
Italy	—N/a	Sarina Joos	—N/a
Kazakhstan	Rakhat Bralin	Amina Alexeyeva	—N/a
Kazakhstan	Dias Jirenbayev	Sofiya Farafonova	—N/a
Kazakhstan	Mikhail Shaidorov	Karina Issakova	—N/a
Kazakhstan	—N/a	Anna Levkovets	—N/a
Kazakhstan	—N/a	Sofia Samodelkina	—N/a
Kazakhstan	—N/a	Russalina Shakrova	—N/a
Kazakhstan	—N/a	Kristina Timoshenko	—N/a
Malaysia	Ze Zeng Fang	—N/a	
Moldova	—N/a	Anastasia Gracheva	—N/a
Serbia	—N/a	Antonina Dubinina	—N/a
South Korea	—N/a		Hannah Lim; Ye Quan
Sweden	—N/a		Milla Ruud Reitan; Nikolaj Majorov
Ukraine	Kyrylo Marsak	Anastasia Gozhva	Zoe Larson; Andrii Kapran
United States	Goku Endo	Starr Andrews	Oona Brown; Gage Brown
United States	Daniel Martynov	—N/a	Isabella Flores; Ivan Desyatov

=== Changes to preliminary assignments ===
Date	Discipline	Withdrew	Added	Notes	Ref.
September 13	Women	(Cyprus); Marilena Kitromilis	—N/a		
September 13	Ice dance	(Canada); Laurence Fournier Beaudry; Nikolaj Sørensen	(Canada); Alicia Fabbri; Paul Ayer		
September 25	Men	(Kazakhstan); Oleg Melnikov	—N/a		
September 25	Women	(Finland); Linnea Ceder	—N/a		
September 25	Ice dance	(Australia); Holly Harris; Jason Chan	—N/a		
September 25	Ice dance	(Poland); Anastasia Polibina; Pavel Golovishnikov	—N/a		
October 4	Ice dance	(Cyprus); Angelina Kudryavtseva; Ilia Karankevich	—N/a		
October 4	Ice dance	(Georgia (country)); Diana Davis; Gleb Smolkin	—N/a	Injury	
October 4	Ice dance	(Germany); Jennifer Janse van Rensburg; Benjamin Steffan	—N/a	Injury (Steffan)	
October 4	Ice dance	(Italy); Victoria Manni; Carlo Röthlisberger	—N/a	Lost luggage	

== Results ==
=== Men's singles ===
Men's results
Rank	Skater	Nation	Total points	SP		FS	
1st place, gold medalist(s)	Mikhail Shaidorov	Kazakhstan	262.33	1	95.50	2	166.83
2nd place, silver medalist(s)	Vladimir Litvintsev	Azerbaijan	246.00	3	84.03	3	161.97
3rd place, bronze medalist(s)	Nika Egadze	Georgia	242.43	2	90.06	4	152.37
4	Daniel Grassl	Italy	237.70	6	66.79	1	170.91
5	Semen Daniliants	Armenia	216.89	4	73.70	6	143.19
6	Kyrylo Marsak	Ukraine	209.28	10	62.33	5	146.95
7	Goku Endo	United States	203.03	9	62.50	8	140.53
8	Aleksa Rakic	Canada	198.47	13	56.06	7	142.41
9	Dias Jirenbayev	Kazakhstan	197.66	7	65.69	9	131.97
10	Valtter Virtanen	Finland	187.63	5	67.38	10	120.25
11	Fang Ze Zeng	Malaysia	174.86	8	62.85	11	112.01
12	Rakhat Bralin	Kazakhstan	172.29	11	61.94	13	110.35
13	Daniel Martynov	United States	170.27	12	58.54	12	111.73

=== Women's singles ===
Women's results
Rank	Skater	Nation	Total points	SP		FS	
1st place, gold medalist(s)	Anastasiia Gubanova	Georgia	195.91	1	69.07	2	126.84
2nd place, silver medalist(s)	Sofia Samodelkina	Kazakhstan	189.67	3	63.84	3	125.83
3rd place, bronze medalist(s)	Lara Naki Gutmann	Italy	188.86	4	61.21	1	127.65
4	Uliana Shiryaeva	Canada	178.83	2	64.43	5	114.40
5	Mariia Seniuk	Israel	172.39	7	55.56	4	116.83
6	Alexandra Feigin	Bulgaria	168.33	5	59.73	6	108.60
7	Kaiya Ruiter	Canada	159.75	10	52.78	7	106.97
8	Zhu Yi	China	155.47	8	55.45	9	100.02
9	Anastasia Gozhva	Ukraine	154.22	9	53.64	8	100.58
10	Starr Andrews	United States	151.65	6	59.10	10	92.55
11	Anastasia Gracheva	Moldova	140.81	11	50.33	11	90.48
12	Eliška Březinová	Czech Republic	131.52	13	47.88	12	83.64
13	Sofiya Farafanova	Kazakhstan	129.74	12	48.64	13	81.10
14	Antonina Dubinina	Serbia	122.20	15	45.60	14	76.60
15	Viktoriia Iushchenkova	Israel	118.28	14	46.51	15	71.77
16	Karina Issakova	Kazakhstan	99.29	16	38.27	17	61.02
17	Amina Alexeyeva	Kazakhstan	98.85	18	29.59	16	69.26
18	Kristina Timoshenko	Kazakhstan	94.22	17	34.74	18	59.48
WD	Russalina Shakrova	Kazakhstan	withdrew	19	22.24	withdrew from competition	

=== Ice dance ===
Ice dance results
Rank	Skater	Nation	Total points	RD		FD	
1st place, gold medalist(s)	Natálie Taschlerová; Filip Taschler	Czech Republic	189.23	2	73.03	1	116.20
2nd place, silver medalist(s)	Oona Brown; Gage Brown	United States	186.96	3	73.01	2	113.95
3rd place, bronze medalist(s)	Alicia Fabbri; Paul Ayer	Canada	182.98	1	73.66	3	109.32
4	Kateřina Mrázková; Daniel Mrázek	Czech Republic	180.75	4	72.28	5	108.47
5	Hannah Lim; Ye Quan	South Korea	177.29	5	69.91	6	107.38
6	Isabella Flores; Ivan Desyatov	United States	174.32	6	65.63	4	108.69
7	Phebe Bekker; James Hernandez	Great Britain	166.95	8	64.07	7	102.88
8	Marie Dupayage; Thomas Nabais	France	164.53	7	64.08	9	100.45
9	Milla Ruud Reitan; Nikolaj Majorov	Sweden	160.78	11	58.88	8	101.90
10	Zoe Larson; Andrii Kapran	Ukraine	160.30	9	60.59	10	99.71
11	Lily Hensen; Nathan Lickers	Canada	157.43	10	60.30	11	97.13
12	Lucy Hancock; Ilias Fourati	Hungary	140.49	12	57.19	12	83.30
13	Kristina Dobroserdova; Alessandro Pellegrini	Armenia	135.94	13	54.49	13	81.45
14	Maxine Weatherby; Oleksandr Kolosovskyi	Azerbaijan	134.15	14	53.52	15	80.63
15	Natalia Pallu-Neves; Jayin Panesar	Brazil	131.84	15	51.19	14	80.65
16	Daniela Ivanitskiy; Matthew Sperry	Finland	119.42	16	50.59	16	68.83
