= Natalia Pallu-Neves =

Brazilian ice dancer

Personal information
- Born: 12 June 2004 (age 22) London, England
- Home town: Philadelphia, Pennsylvania
- Height: 160 cm (5 ft 3 in)

Figure skating career
- Country: Brazil
- Partner: Jayin Panesar
- Coach: Penny Coomes, Nicholas Buckland, Karen Quinn, Alan Abretti
- Skating club: Streatham Supreme Skaters
- Began skating: 2011

Natalia Pallu-Neves (born 12 June 2004) is a British-Brazilian ice dancer who currently competes for Brazil.

With her skating partner, Jayin Panesar, she is the 2022 British national junior bronze medalist. Additionally, she secured two bronze medals in the junior category at the previous two British Championships with her former partner, Frank Roselli.

Pallu-Neves and Panesar started to represent Brazil in the 2022–23 season, becoming the first Brazilian ice dancers to compete in the senior level.

== Personal life ==
Natalia Pallu-Neves was born on 12 June 2004 in London, England. Her parents, who were born in Curitiba and Salvador in Brazil, moved to England before her birth.

As of 2023, she is pursuing a degree in History at Queen Mary University.

== Career ==
=== Early career ===
Pallu-Neves began her skating journey at the age of seven, initially participating in both ice dance and singles skating. However, at the age of 13, she decided to focus exclusively on ice dance. She partnered with Frank Roselli, competing internationally in the 2017–18 and 2018–19 seasons and securing two bronze medals at the British Championships in the junior category before parting ways after two seasons.

=== 2021–22 season: Junior Grand Prix debut ===
Pallu-Neves and Jayin Panesar established their new partnership in the midst of the COVID-19 pandemic and officially debuted internationally in the 2021–22 Junior Grand Prix circuit in Courchevel, France, where they finished in thirteenth place. They won the bronze medal at the 2022 British Junior Championships.

=== 2022–23 season: Switch to Brazil and senior debut ===
Pallu-Neves and Panesar allegedly faced challenges due to a lack of support from the British Ice Skating organization during the 2021–22 season, which lead them to switch countries to Brazil, Pallu-Neves' parents home country instead. Pallu-Neves explained, "We didn't have the support to succeed. So the season was very difficult. The federation didn't help at all." However, due to the recent change in their country of representation, they were unable to compete in any ISU events until after February 2023, as they had to comply with the mandatory one-year suspension imposed by the ISU on athletes changing their representation.

Despite these challenges, Pallu-Neves and Panesar aimed to qualify for the 2023 World Championships and made their debut in the senior category at the 2023 Egna Dance Trophy, which made them the first senior team to ever represent Brazil in ice dance. They achieved a total score of 124.05 points and met the required technical scores in rhythmic dance for the 2023 Four Continents Championships.

The team also participated in the 2023 Challenge Cup, their final opportunity at that season to earn the necessary minimum technical scores for a 2023 World Championships entry. However, Pallu-Neves and Panesar finished in thirteenth place with a total of 123.95 points, failing to meet the required scores for a World Championships entry.

=== 2023-24 season: Four Continents spot ===
In 2023, Pallu-Neves/Panesar changed coaches to former British ice dance champions Nicholas Buckland and Penny Coomes and moved to Philadelphia.

They started their competitive season at the Lombardia Trophy Challenger where they finished at 15th, achieving a new official personal best. In October, they competed at the Swiss Open Trophy, where a historical mark was achieved as they managed to get the necessary minimum technical scores for a Four Continents Championships entry, the first ever for Brazil. They also managed to get their World Championships minimum technical scores, although for the free dance only. In February, Pallu-Neves and Panesar became the first Brazilian ice dance team to ever compete at an ISU Championship after their 14th place finish at the 2024 Four Continents Championships. At the 2024 Challenge Cup, they finished in 10th place; they were short of the minimum technical score for the World Championships in the rhythm dance by less than a point.

=== 2024–25 season ===
Beginning the season by competing on the 2024–25 ISU Challenger Series, Pallu-Neves/Panesar finished 15th at the 2024 CS Denis Ten Memorial Challenge and 12th at the 2024 CS Trophée Métropole Nice Côte d'Azur. During the 2025 Egna Dance Trophy rhythm dance warm up, Pallu-Neves had an accidental collision with another team and withdrew the competition immediately, leaving to the hospital. Afterwards, she announced she had fractured her knee and would be finishing the season prematurely.

== Programs ==
=== Ice dance with Jayin Panesar ===
Season	Rhythm dance	Free dance	Exhibition
2024–2025	Hot Stuff; I Feel Love; On the Radio; by Donna Summer	Pompeii MMXXIII; by Bastille, BBC National Orchestra Of Wales, Ben Palmer, Hans Zimmer: Mystery of Love; by Sufjan Stevens	
2023–2024	Need You Tonight; Never Tear Us Apart; New Sensation by INXS, Andrew Farriss, Michael Hutchence choreo. by Nicholas Buckland, Penny Coomes, Zhanna Palagina	1999; Nothing Compares 2 U; Kiss by Prince choreo. by Mathieu Geffré, Phillipa Towler-Green	
2022–2023	Salsa: La Rebelión by Joe Arroyo, La Verdad; Rhumba: Rhythm (Rumba / 25 Bpm) by Ballroom Orchestra & Singers - Dancelife Studio Orchestra, Frank Westrus, Jeroen Englebert; Merengue: Lambada by Kaoma, Gonzalo & Ulises Hermosa choreo. by Mathieu Geffré, Phillipa Towler-Green	1999; Nothing Compares 2 U; Kiss by Prince choreo. by Mathieu Geffré, Phillipa Towler-Green	1999; Nothing Compares 2 U; Kiss by Prince choreo. by Mathieu Geffré, Phillipa Towler-Green
2021–2022	Blues: Feeling Good by Anthony Newley, Leslie Bricusse performed by Nina Simone; Swing: It Don't Mean A Thing by Duke Ellington, Irving Mills Club des Belugas	West Side Story; Overture; Dance at the Gym; America by Leonard Bernstein	

== Competitive highlights ==
- JGP – Event of the ISU Junior Grand Prix Series
- CS – Event of the ISU Challenger Series

=== Ice dance with Jayin Panesar (for Brazil) ===
Competition placements at senior level
Season	2022–23	2023–24	2024–25	2025–26	2026–27
Four Continents Championships		14th	WD	14th	
CS Denis Ten Memorial		11th	15th		
CS Golden Spin of Zagreb		15th	9th	19th	
CS Lombardia Trophy		15th			
CS Trialeti Trophy				14th	16th
CS Trophée Métropole Nice			12th		
Bosphorus Cup		12th	12th	7th	
Denkova-Staviski Cup				8th	13th
Challenge Cup	13th	10th			
Egna Dance Trophy	10th	12th			
Ephesus Cup			4th		
Finnish Ice Dance Open				6th	
Pavel Roman Memorial			9th		
Swiss Open Trophy		7th			

=== Ice dance with Jayin Panesar (for Great Britain) ===
International: Junior
Event	21–22
JGP France	13th
Egna Trophy	12th
Open d'Andorra	10th
National
British Championships	3rd J

=== With Roselli for Great Britain ===
International: Junior
Event	17–18	18–19
GP of Bratislava		7th
Halloween Cup	10th	9th
Open d'Andorra	14th	
Pavel Roman Memorial		12th
National
British Championships	3rd J	3rd J

== Detailed results ==
=== Ice dance with Jayin Panesar (for Brazil) ===
Results in the 2025–26 season
Date	Event	SP		FS		Total	
Date	Event	P	Score	P	Score	P	Score
Oct 8–11, 2025	(Georgia (country)) 2025 CS Trialeti Trophy	14	50.24	12	86.20	14	136.44
Nov 7-9, 2025	(Bulgaria) 2025 Denkova-Staviski Cup	10	56.46	6	95.56	8	152.02
Nov 24-30, 2025	(Turkey) 2025 Bosphorus Cup	9	58.96	6	96.87	7	155.83
Dec 3-6, 2025	(Croatia) 2025 CS Golden Spin of Zagreb	18	51.29	19	79.80	19	131.09
Jan 21-25, 2026	(China) 2026 Four Continents Championships	13	46.02	13	86.04	14	132.06
Feb 14-15, 2026	(Finland) 2026 Finnish Ice Dance Open	7	51.81	6	89.17	6	140.98

Results in the 2026–27icedance=RD/FD season
Date	Event	SP		FS		Total	
Date	Event	P	Score	P	Score	P	Score
Oct 1–4, 2026	(Georgia (country)) 2026 CS Trialeti Trophy	15	53.31	15	81.92	16	135.23
Nov 6–8, 2026	(Bulgaria) 2026 Denkova-Staviski Cup	12	55.45	14	82.25	13	137.70

2024–25 season
Date	Event	RD	FD	Total
January 20–24, 2024	2025 Ephesus Cup	4 60.29	3 95.84	4 156.13
December 4–7, 2024	2024 CS Golden Spin of Zagreb	10 58.64	9 88.39	9 147.03
November 25-December 1, 2024	2024 Bosphorus Cup	15 57.70	12 91.66	12 149.36
November 9–20, 2024	2024 Pavel Roman Memorial	8 55.57	7 88.40	9 143.97
October 16–20, 2024	2024 CS Trophée Métropole Nice Côte d'Azur	13 51.97	12 82.00	12 133.97
October 3–5, 2024	2024 CS Denis Ten Memorial Challenge	15; 51.19	14; 80.65	15; 131.84
2023–24 season
February 22–25, 2024	2024 Challenge Cup	12; 50.76	12; 80.51	10; 131.27
February 8–11, 2024	2024 Egna Dance Trophy	13; 48.86	11; 79.35	12; 128.21
February 1–4, 2024	2024 Four Continents Championships	15; 50.59	15; 85.38	14; 135.97
December 6–9, 2023	2023 CS Golden Spin of Zagreb	13; 54.60	15; 84.14	15; 138.74
November 27-December 3, 2023	2023 Bosphorus Cup	10; 58.54	13; 92.49	12; 151.03
November 2–5, 2023	2023 CS Denis Ten Memorial	11; 53.17	11; 78.42	11; 131.59
October 26–29, 2023	2023 Swiss Ice Skating Open	8; 54.31	6; 89.14	7; 143.45
August 31-September 2, 2023	2023 CS Lombardia Trophy	15; 46.49	15; 72.53	15; 119.02
2022–23 season
February 23–26, 2023	2023 Challenge Cup	13; 48.34	13; 75.61	13; 123.95
February 9–12, 2023	2023 Egna Dance Trophy	9; 51.05	10; 73.00	10; 124.05

=== Ice dance with Jayin Panesar (for Great Britain) ===
Date	Event	RD	FD	Total
2021-22 season
February 4–6, 2022	2022 Egna Dance Trophy	7 39.47	7 60.63	7 100.10
November 30-December 5, 2021	2022 British Junior Nationals	3 37.82	3 58.98	3 96.80
November 24–28, 2021	2021 Open d'Andorra	11 37.99	10 70.83	11 108.82
August 25–28, 2021	2021 JGP de Courchevel II	5 46.09	5 65.00	5 111.09

=== With Roselli for Great Britain ===
Date	Event	RD	FD	Total
2018-19 season
December 14–16, 2018	2018 Grand Prix of Bratislava	7 41.97	7 63.47	7 105.44
November 26-December 1, 2018	2019 British Nationals	3 40.55	3 61.89	3 102.44
October 19–21, 2023	2018 Halloween Cup	10 39.61	9 62.08	9 101.69
2017-18 season
November 28-December 4, 2017	2018 British Nationals	3 33.35	3 49.56	3 82.91
November 22–26, 2017	2017 Open d'Andorra	14 34.53	13 49.53	14 84.06
October 21–23, 2017	2017 Halloween Cup	9 35.10	10 46.23	10 81.33
