= Jayin Panesar =

Brazilian ice dancer

Personal information
- Born: 10 October 2003 (age 23) London, England

Figure skating career
- Country: Brazil
- Partner: Natalia Pallu-Neves
- Coach: Penny Coomes, Nicholas Buckland, Karen Quinn, Alan Abretti
- Skating club: Streatham Supreme Skaters
- Began skating: 2010

Jayin Panesar (born October 10, 2003) is a British ice dancer who currently competes for Brazil with Natalia Pallu-Neves.

With Pallu-Neves, he is the 2022 British national junior bronze medalist. They began representing Brazil in the 2022–23 season, becoming the first Brazilian ice dancers to ever compete in the senior level. He previously represented Great Britain with Pallu-Neves at the junior level, and with Emily Phillips at the novice level.

== Career ==
=== Early career ===
Panesar began skating at around age seven. Initially he focused on ice hockey, but he later switched to figure skating and tried ice dancing after a coach's suggestion.

He teamed up with Emily Phillips for the 2013–14 season. They won bronze at the 2016 British Championships in the basic novice level and won the event three years later. They split after six seasons competing together.

=== 2021–22 season: Junior Grand Prix debut ===
Pallu-Neves and Jayin Panesar established their new partnership in the midst of the COVID-19 pandemic and officially debuted internationally in the 2021–22 Junior Grand Prix circuit in Courchevel, France, where they finished in thirteenth place. They won the bronze medal at the 2022 British Junior Championships.

=== 2022–23 season: Switch to Brazil and senior debut ===
Pallu-Neves and Panesar allegedly faced challenges due to a lack of support from the British Ice Skating organization during the 2021–22 season, which lead them to switch countries to Brazil, Pallu-Neves' parents home country. Pallu-Neves explained, "We didn't have the support to succeed. So the season was very difficult. The federation didn't help at all." However, due to the recent change in their country of representation, they were unable to compete in any ISU events until after February 2023, as they had to comply with the mandatory one-year suspension imposed by the ISU on athletes changing their representation.

Despite these challenges, Pallu-Neves and Panesar aimed to qualify for the 2023 World Championships and made their debut in the senior category at the 2023 Egna Dance Trophy, which made them the first senior team to ever represent Brazil in ice dance. They achieved a total score of 124.05 points and met the required technical scores in rhythmic dance for the 2023 Four Continents Championships.

The team also participated in the 2023 Challenge Cup, their final opportunity at that season to earn the necessary minimum technical scores for a 2023 World Championships entry. However, Pallu-Neves and Panesar finished in thirteenth place with a total of 123.95 points, failing to meet the required scores for a World Championships entry.

=== 2023–24 season: Four Continents spot ===
In 2023, Pallu-Neves/Panesar changed coaches to former British ice dance champions Nicholas Buckland and Penny Coomes and moved to Philadelphia.

They started their competitive season at the Lombardia Trophy Challenger where they finished at 15th, achieving a new official personal best. In October, they competed at the Swiss Open Trophy, where a historical mark was achieved as they managed to get the necessary minimum technical scores for a Four Continents Championships entry, the first ever for Brazil. They also managed to get their World Championships minimum technical scores, although for the free dance only. In February, Pallu-Neves and Panesar became the first Brazilian ice dance team to ever compete at an ISU Championship after their 14th place finish at the 2024 Four Continents Championships. At the 2024 Challenge Cup, they finished in 10th place; they were short of the minimum technical score for the World Championships in the rhythm dance by less than a point.

=== 2024–25 season ===
Beginning the season by competing on the 2024–25 ISU Challenger Series, Pallu-Neves/Panesar finished 15th at the 2024 CS Denis Ten Memorial Challenge and 12th at the 2024 CS Trophée Métropole Nice Côte d'Azur.

== Programs ==
=== Ice dance with Natalia Pallu-Neves ===
Season	Rhythm dance	Free dance	Exhibition
2024–2025	Need You Tonight; Never Tear Us Apart; New Sensation by INXS, Andrew Farriss, Michael Hutchence choreo. by Nicholas Buckland, Penny Coomes, Zhanna Palagina	1999; Nothing Compares 2 U; Kiss by Prince choreo. by Mathieu Geffré, Phillipa Towler-Green	
2023–2024	Need You Tonight; Never Tear Us Apart; New Sensation by INXS, Andrew Farriss, Michael Hutchence choreo. by Nicholas Buckland, Penny Coomes, Zhanna Palagina	1999; Nothing Compares 2 U; Kiss by Prince choreo. by Mathieu Geffré, Phillipa Towler-Green	
2022–2023	Salsa: La Rebelión by Joe Arroyo, La Verdad; Rhumba: Rhythm (Rumba / 25 Bpm) by Ballroom Orchestra & Singers - Dancelife Studio Orchestra, Frank Westrus, Jeroen Englebert; Merengue: Lambada by Kaoma, Gonzalo & Ulises Hermosa choreo. by Mathieu Geffré, Phillipa Towler-Green	1999; Nothing Compares 2 U; Kiss by Prince choreo. by Mathieu Geffré, Phillipa Towler-Green	1999; Nothing Compares 2 U; Kiss by Prince choreo. by Mathieu Geffré, Phillipa Towler-Green
2021–2022	Blues: Feeling Good by Anthony Newley, Leslie Bricusse performed by Nina Simone; Swing: It Don't Mean A Thing by Duke Ellington, Irving Mills Club des Belugas	West Side Story; Overture; Dance at the Gym; America by Leonard Bernstein	

== Competitive highlights ==
- JGP – Event of the ISU Junior Grand Prix Series
- CS – Event of the ISU Challenger Series

=== Ice dance with Natalia Pallu-Neves (for Brazil) ===
Competition placements at senior level
Season	2022–23	2023–24	2024–25	2025–26	2026–27
Four Continents Championships		14th	WD	14th	
CS Denis Ten Memorial		11th	15th		
CS Golden Spin of Zagreb		15th	9th	19th	
CS Lombardia Trophy		15th			
CS Trialeti Trophy				14th	16th
CS Trophée Métropole Nice			12th		
Bosphorus Cup		12th	12th	7th	
Denkova-Staviski Cup				8th	13th
Challenge Cup	13th	10th			
Egna Dance Trophy	10th	12th			
Ephesus Cup			4th		
Finnish Ice Dance Open				6th	
Pavel Roman Memorial			9th		
Swiss Open Trophy		7th			

=== Ice dance with Natalia Pallu-Neves (for Great Britain) ===
International: Junior
Event	21–22
JGP France	13th
Egna Trophy	12th
Open d'Andorra	10th
National
British Championships	3rd J

== Detailed results ==
=== Ice dance with Natalia Pallu-Neves (for Brazil) ===
Results in the 2025–26 season
Date	Event	SP		FS		Total	
Date	Event	P	Score	P	Score	P	Score
Oct 8–11, 2025	(Georgia (country)) 2025 CS Trialeti Trophy	14	50.24	12	86.20	14	136.44
Nov 7-9, 2025	(Bulgaria) 2025 Denkova-Staviski Cup	10	56.46	6	95.56	8	152.02
Nov 24-30, 2025	(Turkey) 2025 Bosphorus Cup	9	58.96	6	96.87	7	155.83
Dec 3-6, 2025	(Croatia) 2025 CS Golden Spin of Zagreb	18	51.29	19	79.80	19	131.09
Jan 21-25, 2026	(China) 2026 Four Continents Championships	13	46.02	13	86.04	14	132.06
Feb 14-15, 2026	(Finland) 2026 Finnish Ice Dance Open	7	51.81	6	89.17	6	140.98

Results in the 2026–27icedance=RD/FD season
Date	Event	SP		FS		Total	
Date	Event	P	Score	P	Score	P	Score
Oct 1–4, 2026	(Georgia (country)) 2026 CS Trialeti Trophy	15	53.31	15	81.92	16	135.23
Nov 6–8, 2026	(Bulgaria) 2026 Denkova-Staviski Cup	12	55.45	14	82.25	13	137.70

2024–25 season
Date	Event	RD	FD	Total
November 9–20, 2024	2024 Pavel Roman Memorial	8; 55.57	7; 88.40	9; 144.04
October 16–20, 2024	2024 CS Trophée Métropole Nice Côte d'Azur	13; 51.97	12; 82.00	12; 133.97
October 3–5, 2024	2024 CS Denis Ten Memorial Challenge	15; 51.19	14; 80.65	15; 131.84
2023–24 season
February 22–25, 2024	2024 Challenge Cup	12; 50.76	12; 80.51	10; 131.27
February 8–11, 2024	2024 Egna Dance Trophy	13; 48.86	11; 79.35	12; 128.21
February 1–4, 2024	2024 Four Continents Championships	15; 50.59	15; 85.38	14; 135.97
December 6–9, 2023	2023 CS Golden Spin of Zagreb	13; 54.60	15; 84.14	15; 138.74
November 27-December 3, 2023	2023 Bosphorus Cup	10; 58.54	13; 92.49	12; 151.03
November 2–5, 2023	2023 CS Denis Ten Memorial	11; 53.17	11; 78.42	11; 131.59
October 26–29, 2023	2023 Swiss Ice Skating Open	8; 54.31	6; 89.14	7; 143.45
August 31-September 2, 2023	2023 CS Lombardia Trophy	15; 46.49	15; 72.53	15; 119.02
2022–23 season
February 23–26, 2023	2023 Challenge Cup	13; 48.34	13; 75.61	13; 123.95
February 9–12, 2023	2023 Egna Dance Trophy	9; 51.05	10; 73.00	10; 124.05

=== Ice dance with Natalia Pallu-Neves (for Great Britain) ===
Date	Event	RD	FD	Total
2021-22 season
February 4–6, 2022	2022 Egna Dance Trophy	7 39.47	7 60.63	7 100.10
November 30-December 5, 2021	2022 British Junior Nationals	3 37.82	3 58.98	3 96.80
November 24–28, 2021	2021 Open d'Andorra	11 37.99	10 70.83	11 108.82
August 25–28, 2021	2021 JGP de Courchevel II	5 46.09	5 65.00	5 111.09
