= Alina Urushadze =

Figure skater (born 2004)

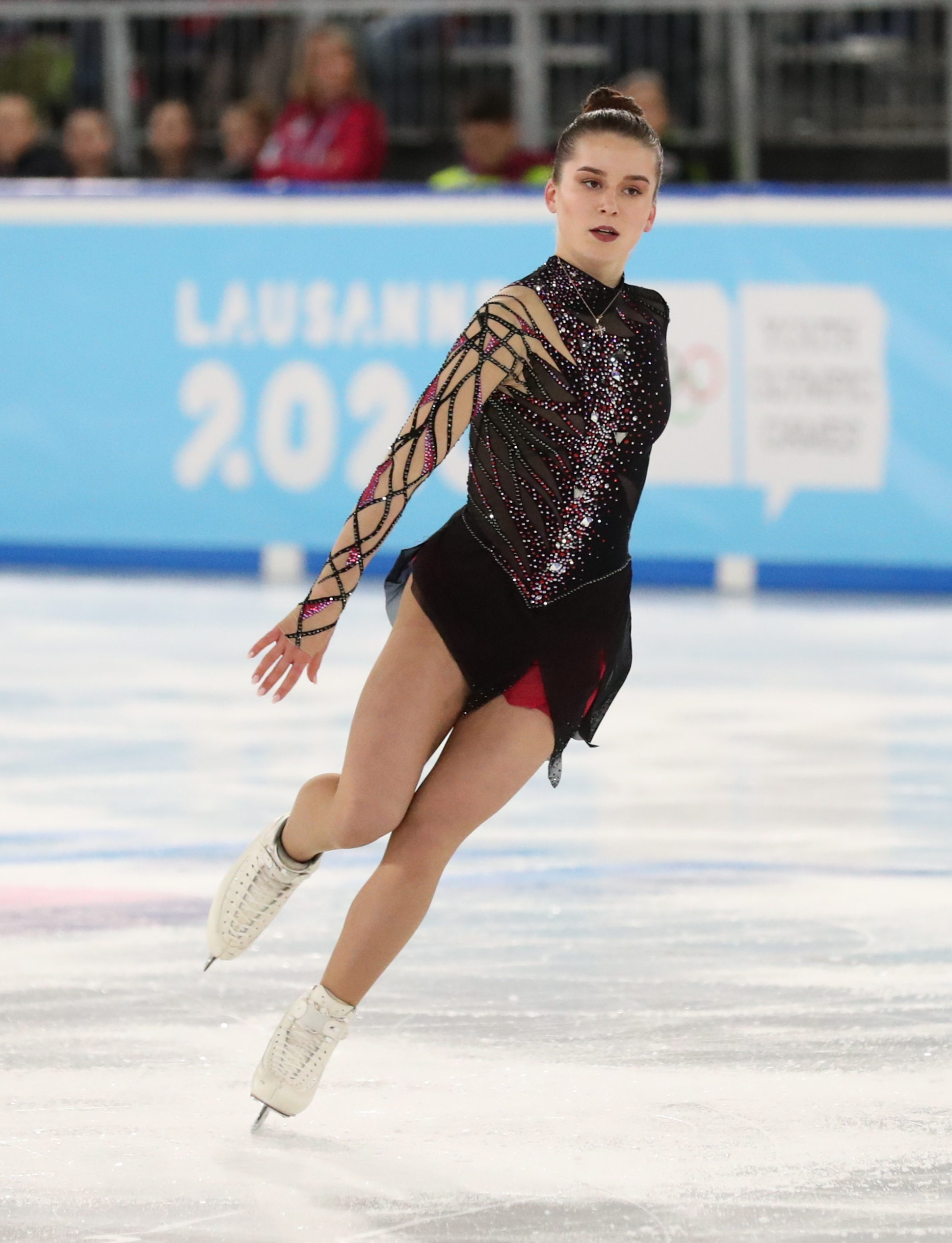
- Alina Urushadze at the 2020 Winter Youth Olympics

Personal information
- Native name: ალინა ურუშაძე
- Born: 7 January 2004 (age 22) Riga, Latvia
- Height: 1.64 m (5 ft 4 1/2 in)

Figure skating career
- Country: Georgia (since 2018); Latvia (until 2018)
- Discipline: Women's singles
- Coach: Andrejs Brovenko
- Skating club: Skating Skills
- Began skating: 2008
- Retired: November 19, 2024

Medal record
Georgian Championships
Silver medal – second place	2024 Tbilisi	Singles

Alina Urushadze (Georgian: ალინა ურუშაძე, Russian: Алина Урушадзе; born 7 January 2004) is a retired Latvian-Georgian figure skater.

Representing Georgia, she is the 2019 Bosphorus Cup silver medalist and the 2019 Volvo Open Cup bronze medalist. She placed 11th at the 2019 World Junior Championships and 5th at the 2020 Winter Youth Olympics.

== Personal life ==
Urushadze was born in Riga, Latvia on 7 January 2004. She has an older brother and younger sister. Her paternal grandfather is Georgian, which aided in her process to obtain Georgian citizenship.

She has expressed interest in becoming a figure skating coach after retiring from competitive figure skating.

== Career ==
Urushadze began skating in 2008. She initially skated for Latvia until 2018 when Mariam Giorgobiani, the president of the Georgian Figure Skating Federation, approached Urushadze due to her Georgian surname and asked if she would be interested in representing Georgia. Urushadze agreed to this and began representing Georgia in October 2018 at the age of thirteen.

=== 2018–2019 season ===
In October 2018, Urushadze made her ISU Junior Grand Prix series debut in Yerevan, Armenia at the 2018 JGP Armenia. Despite placing fifth in both the short program and the free skate, she finished sixth overall and did not receive another Junior Grand Prix assignment for the season. Throughout the rest of the season, Urushadze went on to compete in the junior category at a number of smaller events, before wrapping up with her two largest events of the season: the 2019 European Youth Olympic Winter Festival and the 2019 World Junior Championships. At EYOF, Urushadze placed fourth in the short program, but fell to seventh after the free skate and sixth overall.

At Junior Worlds the following month, Urushadze ranked fifteenth after the short program, which put her in the third-to-last warm-up group for the free skate, where she placed eleventh, rising to eleventh overall.

=== 2019–2020 season ===
Given two assignments on the Junior Grand Prix, Urushadze placed eighth in France and sixth in Croatia. After competing at a number of small senior competitions, winning medals at two of them, she competed at the 2020 Winter Youth Olympics in Lausanne, where she placed fifth. Making her senior ISU Championship debut, she placed fifteenth at the 2020 European Championships. She concluded the season with a fifteenth-place finish at the 2020 World Junior Championships.

Urushadze had been assigned to make her World Championship debut in Montreal, but they were cancelled as a result of the coronavirus pandemic.

=== 2020–2021 season ===
With the pandemic continuing to limit international events, the ISU opted to assign the Grand Prix based primarily on geographic location. Urushadze made her Grand Prix debut at the 2020 Rostelecom Cup, finishing tenth among the ten competitors. She placed twentieth at the 2021 World Championships in Stockholm. Urushadze's result qualified a berth for Georgia at the 2022 Winter Olympics.

=== 2021–2022 season ===
Urushadze began the season by competing on the Junior Grand Prix series, finishing seventh at the 2021 JGP France I. She went on to finish fifth at the 2021 Budapest Trophy. At the 2021 Volvo Open Cup, Urushadze won the gold medal before finishing seventeenth at the 2021 CS Warsaw Cup.

The Olympic spot for Georgia was ultimately awarded to Anastasia Gubanova.

=== 2023–2024 season ===
In June 2023, the Georgian Figure Skating Federation announced that Urushadze would return to competition after a season of not competing. It was also announced that Urushadze had left Moscow, returned to her hometown of Riga, and training under former coach, Andrejs Brovenko.

She finished tenth at the 2023 CS Lombardia Trophy and the 2023 CS Budapest Trophy. Urushadze then competed at the 2024 European Championships in Kaunas, Lithuania, finishing twenty-second.

She announced her retirement from competitive figure skating in November 2024.

In April 2025, Urushadze came out of retirement to compete for Team Georgia at the 2025 World Team Trophy. She placed twelfth in the women's singles event and Team Georgia finished in sixth place overall.

== Programs ==
Season	Short program	Free skating	Exhibition
2024–2025	I Wanna Dance by Artem Uzunov choreo. by Nikita Mikhailov	SOS by ABBA; Mamma Mia (from Glee) performed by Chris Colfer, Lea Michele, & Naya Rivera choreo. by Nikita Mikhailov	
2023–2024	Love on the Brain by Rihanna; The Sparkling Diamond (from Moulin Rouge!) performed by Karen Olivo, Robyn Hurder, Jacqueline B. Arnold, Holly James, & Jeigh Madjus choreo. by Nikita Mikhailov	SOS by ABBA; Mamma Mia (from Glee) performed by Chris Colfer, Lea Michele, & Naya Rivera choreo. by Nikita Mikhailov	
2022–23	Did not compete this season		
2021–2022	Creep by Radiohead performed by The 7 Fingers choreo. by Nikita Mikhailov	Anna Karenina by Dario Marianelli choreo. by Nikita Mikhailov	
2020–2021	Asturias by Isaac Albéniz performed by Na Yoon-sun choreo. by Nikita Mikhailov	Non, je ne regrette rien performed by Patricia Kaas; The Ninth Hour by Patricia Kaas; Milord performed by Mireille Mathieu	
2019–2020	Boléro by Maurice Ravel	Mas que nada performed by Sérgio Mendes; Hip Hip Chin Chin performed by Club des Belugas	
2018–2019	Toruk – The First Flight by Boe & Bill (Guy Dubuc and Marc Lessard); "Knock on Wood" by Safri Duo	Selection by Brenna Whitaker; "You Don't Own Me" by Terry Gregory	

== Competitive highlights ==
GP: Grand Prix; CS: Challenger Series; JGP: Junior Grand Prix

International
Event	18–19	19–20	20–21	21–22	23–24	24–25
Worlds		C	20th			
Europeans		15th			22nd	
Georgian Championships					2nd	
GP Rostelecom			10th			
CS Budapest Trophy					10th	
CS Lombardia Trophy		WD			10th	
CS Warsaw Cup		WD		17th		
Budapest Trophy				5th		
Golden Bear		7th				
Istanbul Cup		2nd				
Volvo Open Cup		3rd		1st		
World Team Trophy						6th T 12th P
International: Junior
Youth Olympics		5th				
Junior Worlds	11th	18th				
JGP Armenia	6th					
JGP Croatia		6th				
JGP France		8th		7th		
EYOF	6th					
Ice Star	4th					
Istanbul Cup	2nd					
Prague Ice Cup	2nd					
Skate Helena	1st					

== Detailed results ==
=== Senior level ===
2023–24 season
Date	Event	SP	FS	Total
10-14 January 2024	2024 European Figure Skating Championships	23; 50.54	21; 90.12	22; 140.66
13-15 October 2023	2023 CS Budapest Trophy	15; 50.88	10; 102.49	10; 153.37
8–10 September 2023	2023 CS Lombardia Trophy	7; 54.11	9; 98.49	10; 152.69

=== Junior level ===
2021–22 season
Date	Event	Level	SP	FS	Total
17–20 November 2021	2021 CS Warsaw Cup	Senior	14; 54.11	19; 93.28	17; 147.39
3–7 November 2021	2021 Volvo Open Cup	Senior	3; 55.36	1; 122.93	1; 178.29
14–17 October 2021	2021 Budapest Trophy	Senior	5; 60.32	5; 118.82	5; 179.14
18–21 August 2021	2021 JGP France I	Junior	7; 52.29	7; 90.59	7; 142.88
2020–21 season
22–28 March 2021	2021 World Championships	Senior	18; 59.89	20; 109.12	20; 169.01
20–22 November 2020	2020 Rostelecom Cup	Senior	10; 55.86	10; 94.82	10; 150.68
2019–20 season
Date	Event	Level	SP	FS	Total
2–8 March 2020	2020 World Junior Championships	Junior	18; 52.68	18; 95.43	18; 148.11
24–25 January 2020	2020 European Championships	Senior	12; 59.56	18; 95.25	15; 154.81
10–15 January 2020	2020 Winter Youth Olympics	Junior	5; 63.10	6; 116.40	5; 179.50
25–30 November 2019	2019 Bosphorus Cup	Senior	1; 56.68	2; 100.23	2; 156.91
5–10 November 2019	2019 Volvo Open Cup	Senior	4; 57.07	3; 106.76	3; 163.83
24–27 October 2019	2019 Golden Bear of Zagreb	Senior	7; 53.95	11; 93.26	7; 147.21
25–28 September 2019	2019 JGP Croatia	Junior	5; 55.98	9; 97.60	6; 153.58
21–24 August 2019	2019 JGP France	Junior	8; 55.89	8; 102.13	8; 158.02
2018–2019 season
Date	Event	Level	SP	FS	Total
4–10 March 2019	2019 World Junior Championships	Junior	15; 52.53	11; 105.43	11; 157.96
13–14 February 2019	2019 European Youth Olympic Festival	Junior	4; 55.99	7; 95.30	6; 151.29
16–19 January 2019	2019 Skate Helena	Junior	1; 51.83	2; 94.88	1; 146.71
28–29 November 2018	2018 Bosphorus Cup	Junior	2; 50.36	2; 94.30	2; 144.66
9–11 November 2018	2018 Prague Ice Cup	Junior	3; 46.79	1; 93.08	2; 139.87
18–21 October 2018	2018 Ice Star	Junior	4; 49.18	3; 89.94	4; 139.12
10–13 October 2018	2018 JGP Armenia	Junior	5; 58.31	5; 107.06	6; 165.37
