= Mariia Seniuk =

Russian-Israeli figure skater (born 2005)

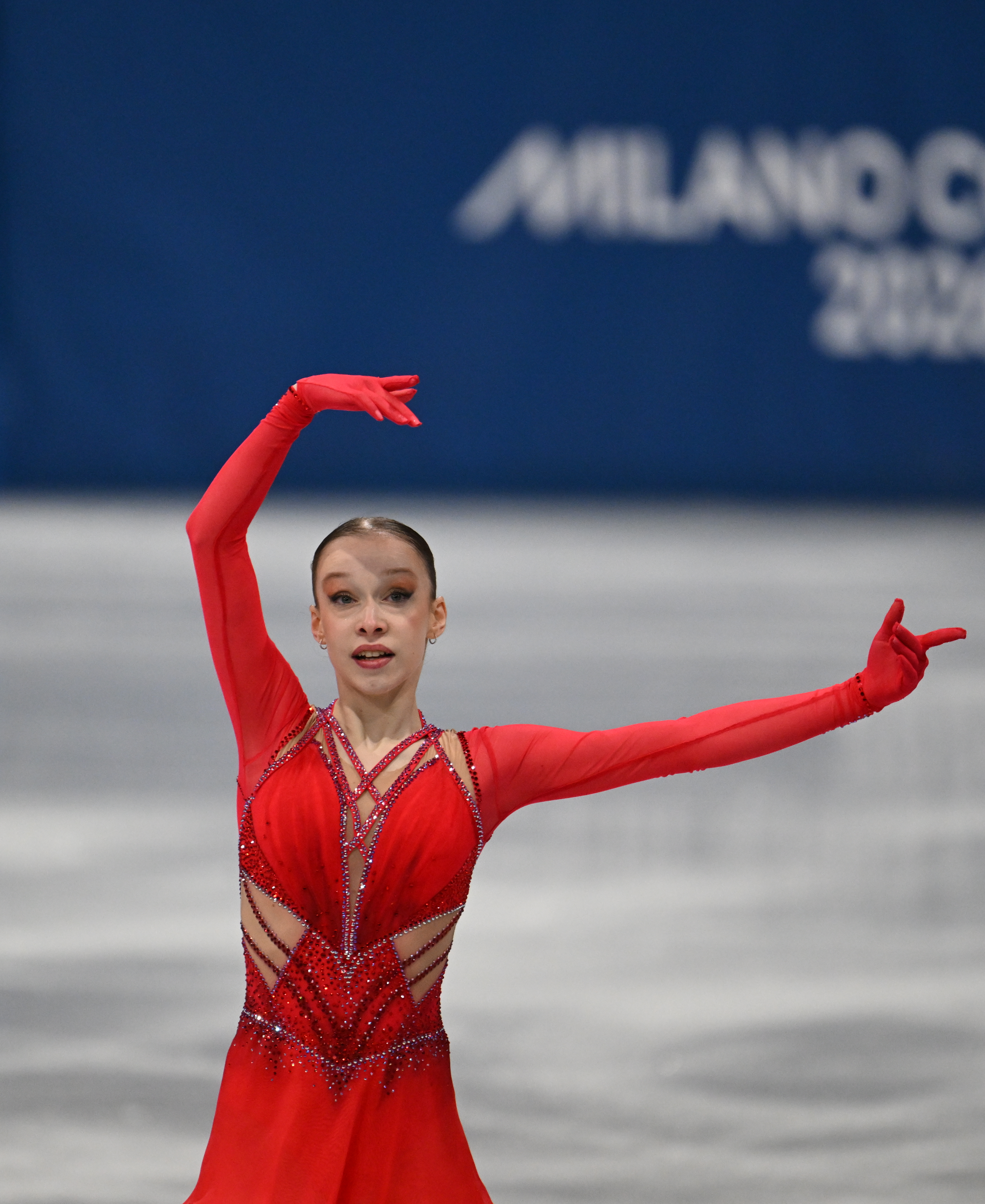
- Seniuk at the 2026 Winter Olympics

Personal information
- Native name: Мария Сенюк
- Born: 7 May 2005 (age 21) Moscow, Russia
- Height: 1.58 m (5 ft 2 in)

Figure skating career
- Country: Israel (since 2019); Russia (until 2017)
- Discipline: Women's singles
- Coach: Polina Tsurskaya
- Skating club: Ice Peaks Holon

Medal record
Israeli Championships
Gold medal – first place	2023 Holon	Singles
Gold medal – first place	2024 Holon	Singles
Gold medal – first place	2025 Holon	Singles
Gold medal – first place	2026 Holon	Singles

Mariia Seniuk (Russian: Мария Сенюк, Hebrew: מריה סניוק; born 7 May 2005) is a Russian-Israeli figure skater. She is a three-time Challenger Series medalist, including gold at the 2023 Denis Ten Memorial Challenge, and a four-time Israeli national champion (2023–2026).

She represented Israel at the 2026 Winter Olympics, making her the first woman to represent Israel in women's singles at the Olympics.

== Personal life ==
Seniuk was born on 7 May 2005 in Moscow, Russia to Jewish parents. She has many relatives that reside in Israel. Seniuk lived there for a short time also.

== Career ==
=== Early career ===
She began skating at 4 years old. Seniuk competed for Russia on the advanced novice level until 2017. She made her junior debut for Israel in 2019.

=== 2021–22 season: Junior Grand Prix debut ===
Mariia debuted on the ISU Junior Grand Prix in Austria, Linz. She placed twelfth with a total score of 136.27.

In 2021, she won her first Israeli national title as a junior. Subsequently, she made her Junior World Championship debut at the 2022 World Junior Championships in Tallinn. She finished nineteenth overall.

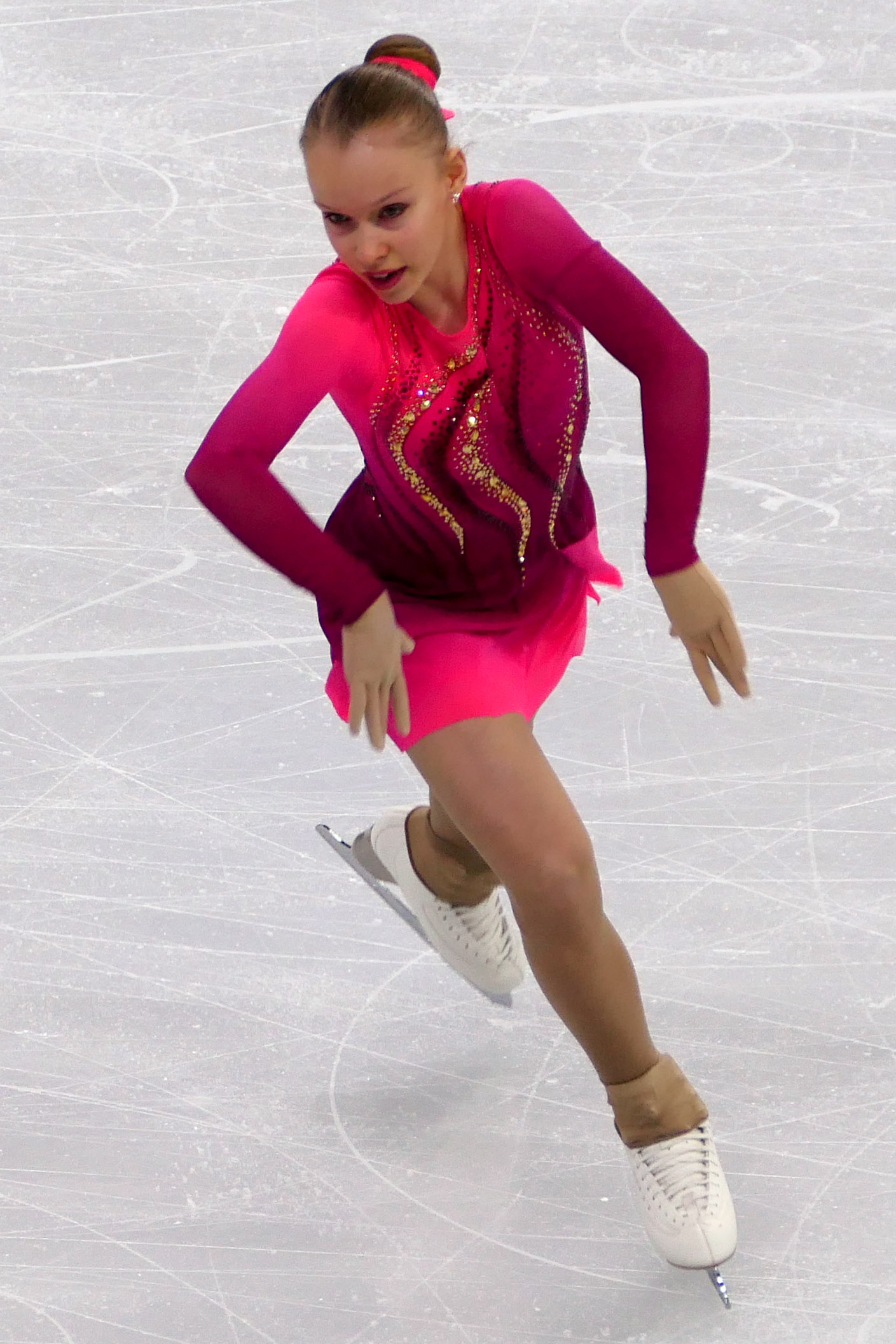
Seniuk at the 2024 World Championships

=== 2022–23 season: International senior debut ===
Seniuk made her senior debut at the 47th Volvo Open Cup in Latvia in 2022. She placed seventh overall.

=== 2023–24 season: European and World Championships debut ===
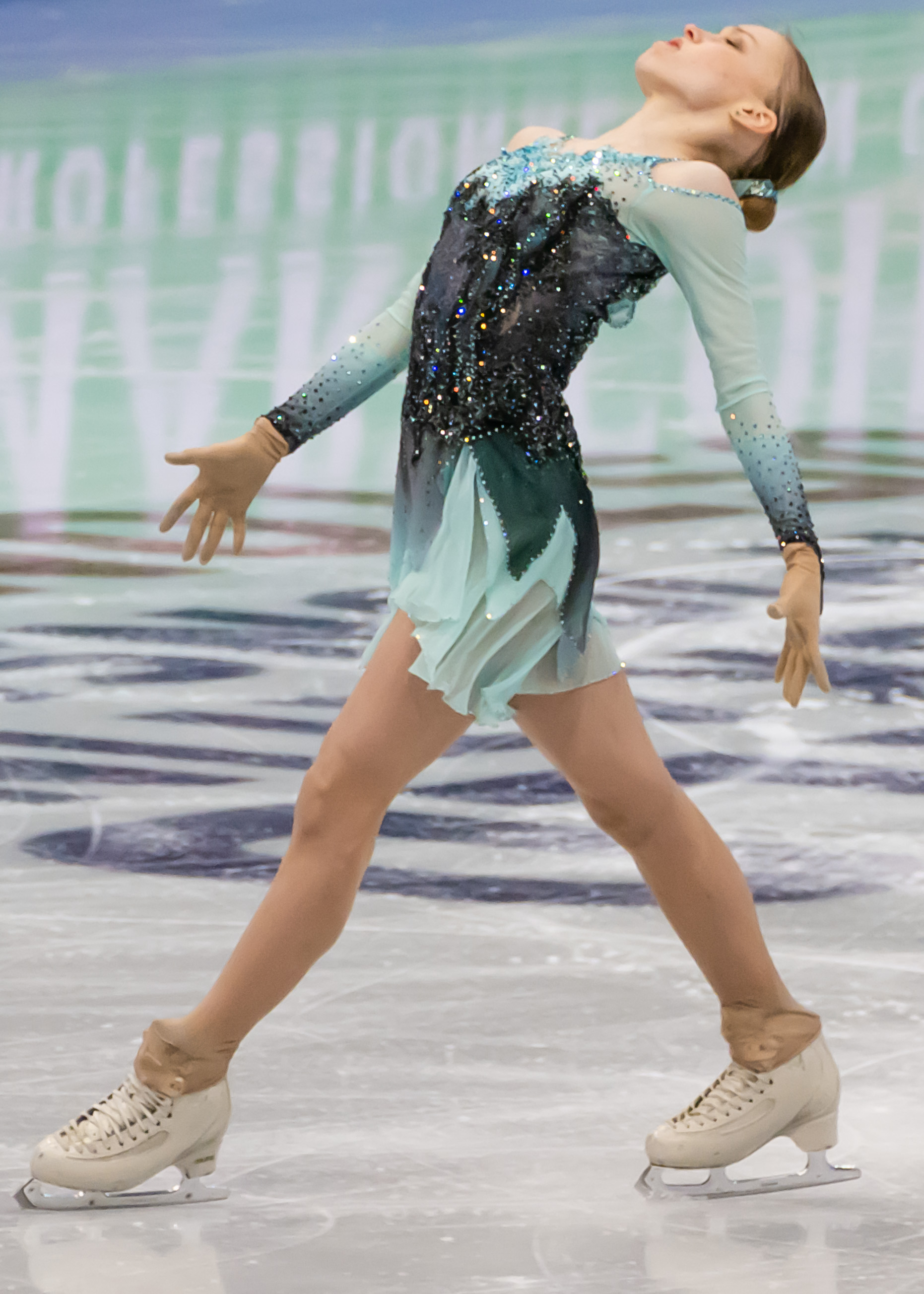
Seniuk at the 2025 World Championships

Seniuk made her first appearance at the ISU European Championships in 2024. She placed eighteenth in both the short and free program segments, ultimately finishing in nineteenth place overall.

At the 2024 World Championships, Seniuk placed thirty-second in the short program, failing to advance to the free skate. A few weeks later, Mariia won her second national title.

=== 2024–25 season: Olympic quota for Israel ===
In December 2024, Seniuk defended her national title. At the 2025 European Championships, she placed thirteenth overall.

Competing at the 2025 World Championships in Boston, Seniuk placed nineteenth in the short program and sixteenth in the free program, placing sixteenth overall and securing an Olympic quota for Israel in women's singles for the upcoming 2026 Winter Olympics. Seniuk expressed joy in earning the quota; "I have so many emotions right now, I don’t even know what to say. It’s just crazy emotional for me at this moment. Honestly, it wasn’t even certain that I would make it here because, until four days ago, I still hadn’t received my visa. There was only a small chance that I would get it in time, so just being here already feels like a miracle."

Seniuk at the 2025 Skate Canada International

=== 2025–26 season: Milano Cortina Olympics, fourth national title, passport issues ===
Seniuk opened the season at the 2025 Trialeti Trophy in Georgia. She won the silver medal behind Anastasiia Gubanova. She achieved a new personal best in both program segments.

Seniuk was assigned to Skate Canada 2025 after Nina Pinzarrones' withdrawal. She finished in eighth overall.

Seniuk defended her national title in December 2025, making this her fourth national title for Israel. In January, Seniuk competed at the 2026 European Championships in Sheffield, England. Finishing both segments in twentieth place, she finished the event in twenty-first place overall.

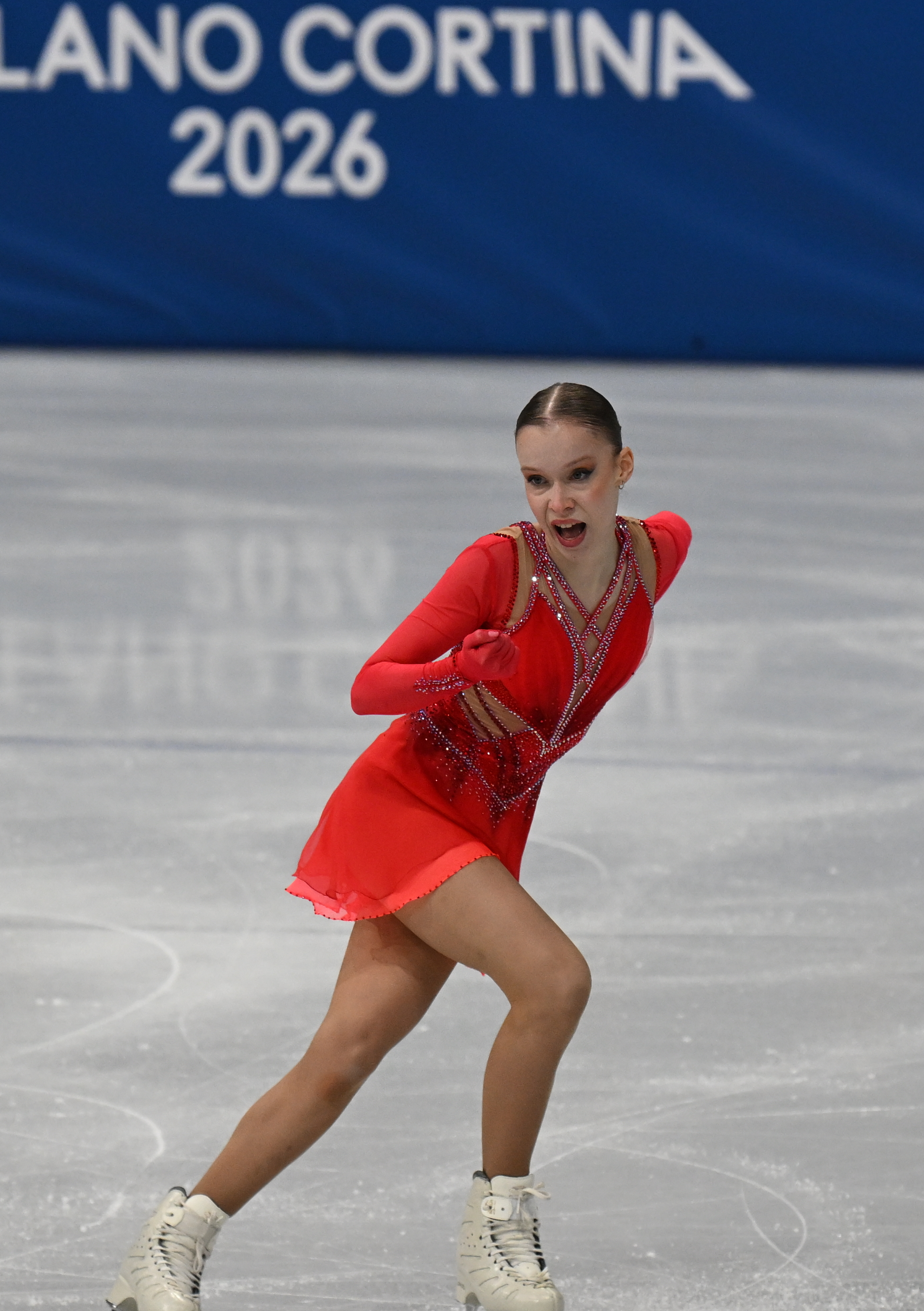
Seniuk performing her free program at the 2026 Winter Olympics

Just days prior of the Olympic entry deadline, Seniuk and two other athletes were faced with passport issues. This occurred since Seniuk was not a permanent resident in Israel, preventing the Israeli Olympic Committee from naming her to the team. "The Times of Israel" shared that "after a regulation passed in 2023 mandated that immigrants can receive a full passport only after a year of residency during which they prove that the centre of their life is in Israel." Only the interior minister has the overall authority to grant passports for those who do not meet the qualifications of this law. However, there had been no interior minister since October 2025 after Yariv Levins' temporary post had concluded. One day before the Olympic entries deadline, on the 25th of January 2026, Seniuk was officially named to the Olympic team. Additionally, Seniuk was named the flag bearer for Israel for the Olympic Opening Ceremony. "It's a great honour for me. I am very pleased that I was chosen" she shared.

Seniuk made her Olympic debut at the 2026 Olympic Winter Games. She placed twenty-second in the short program. In the free skate, she struggled on multiple jumping passes; she finished twenty-fourth overall. "The free program didn't work at all. It was terrible and very hard physically in the freestyle. I usually don't have problems with endurance. It was hard today. Physically, I felt that in the second half I was not gaining the speed with which I was used to jumping. Although I still tried to fight to the end. Of course, I'm upset, but it's life, it happens" says Seniuk.

On the 18th of March 2026, one week before the competition, Mariia withdrew from the 2026 World Championships.

Following this, Seniuk started coaching at the Evolution Figure Skating Club in Moscow, Russia.

=== 2026–27 season ===
Originally assigned to Skate America, Seniuk announced via her Instagram story that she had withdrew from the event.

== Programs ==
Season	Short program	Free skating
2025–2026	Run by Ludovico Einaudi choreo. by Benoît Richaud	Opening Theme (from Stranger Things) by Michael Stein & Kyle Dixon choreo. by Benoît Richaud
2024–2025	La terre vue du ciel by Armand Amar choreo. by Sergei Rozanov, Artem Fedorchenko	Samson and Delilah; Bacchanale; Mon cœur s'ouvre à ta voix by Camille Saint-Saëns choreo. by Sergei Rozanov, Artem Fedorchenko
2023–2024	Animal by Álvaro Soler choreo. by Alexander Zolotarev, Elizaveta Nikitina	Writing's on the Wall performed by Sofia Karlberg; Spectre by Thomas Newman; Maleficent Flies (from Maleficent) by James Newton Howard choreo. by Alexander Zolotarev, Elizaveta Nikitina
2022–2023	Animal by Álvaro Soler choreo. by Alexander Zolotarev, Elizaveta Nikitina	Writing's on the Wall performed by Sofia Karlberg; Spectre by Thomas Newman; Maleficent Flies (from Maleficent) by James Newton Howard choreo. by Alexander Zolotarev, Elizaveta Nikitina
2021–2022	Vivo per lei performed by Andrea Bocelli and Hélène Ségara choreo. by Alla Loboda	Overture (from Ghost) by Dave Stewart and Glen Ballard choreo. by Alla Loboda

== Competitive highlights ==
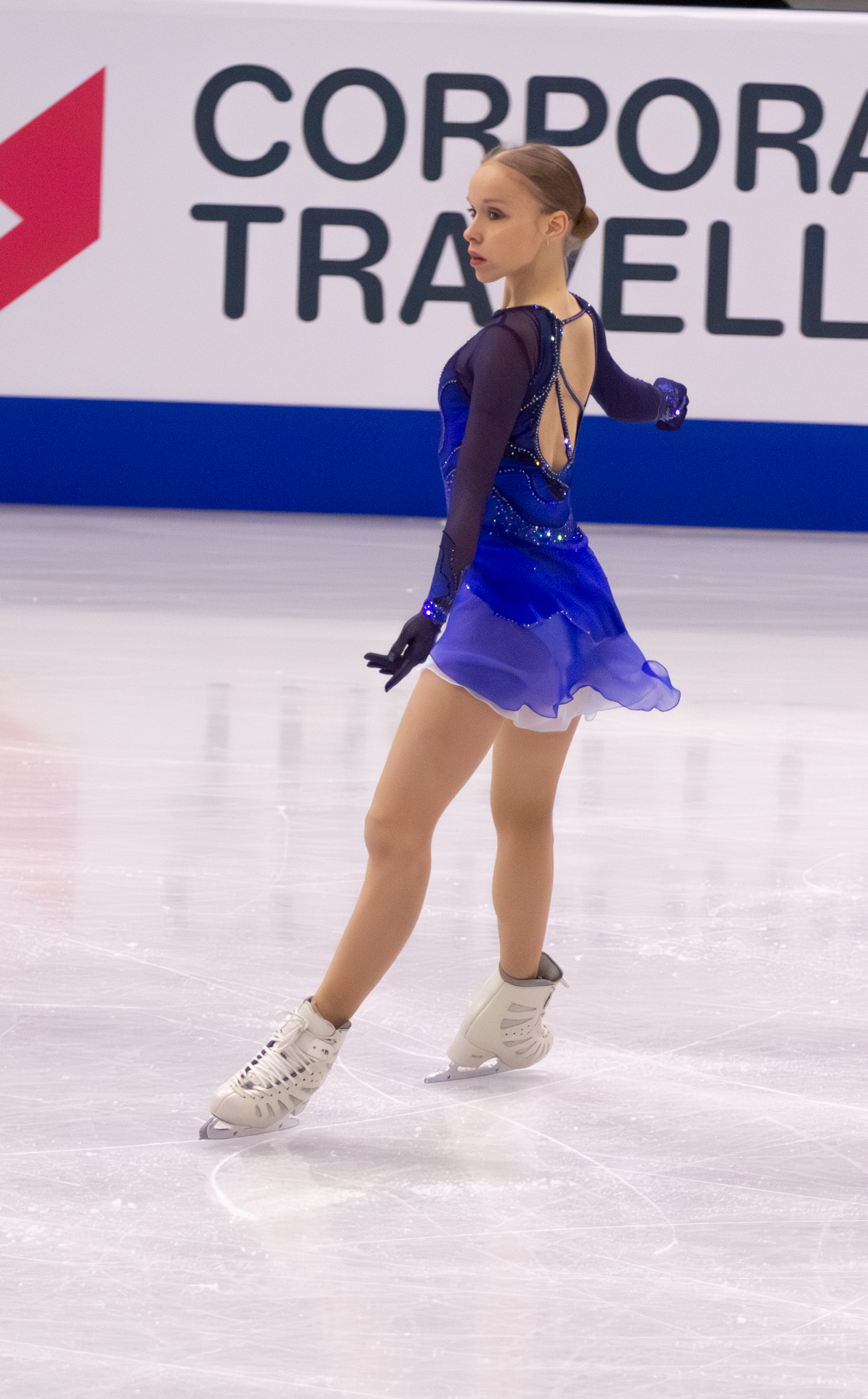
Seniuk at 2025 Skate Canada International

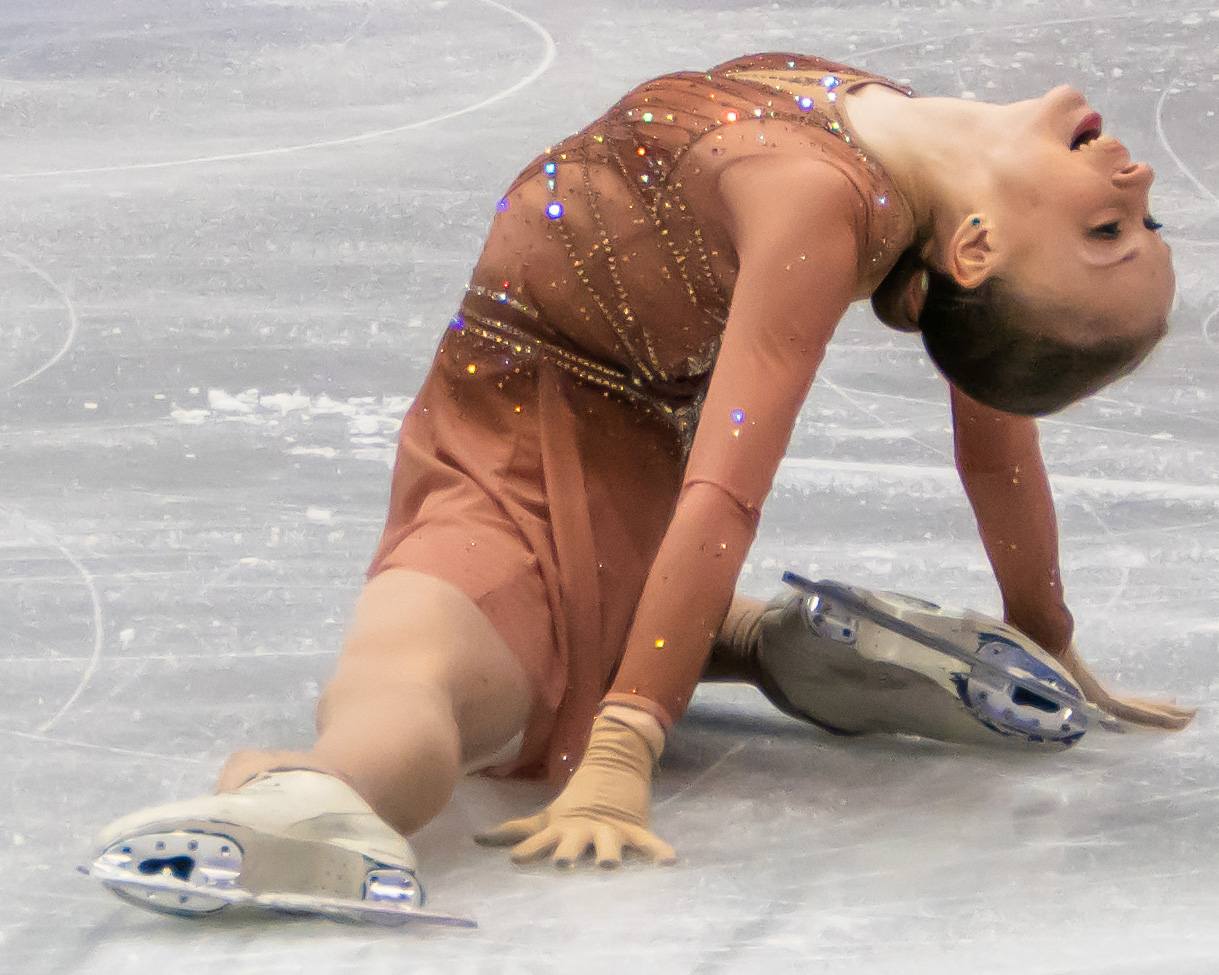
Seniuk following her free skate at the 2025 World Championships

- GP – Event of the ISU Grand Prix Series
- JGP – Event of the ISU Junior Grand Prix Series
- CS – Event of the ISU Challenger Series
- TBD – Assigned
- WD – Withdrew from competition

Competition placements at senior level
Season	2022–23	2023–24	2024–25	2025–26	2026–27
Winter Olympics				24th	
World Championships		32nd	16th		
European Championships		19th	13th	21st	
Israeli Championships	1st	1st	1st	1st	
GP Skate Canada				8th	
CS Denis Ten Memorial		1st	5th		
CS Golden Spin of Zagreb			6th		
CS Nepela Memorial			2nd	4th	
CS Trialeti Trophy				2nd	
Bellu Memorial			7th		
Challenge Cup	17th				
EduSport Trophy		4th			
NRW Trophy			1st		
Santa Claus Cup	2nd				
Tallink Hotels Cup	7th				
Tayside Trophy			1st		
Trophée Métropole Nice		2nd			
Volvo Open Cup	7th				

Competition placements at junior level
Season	2019–20	2021–22	2022–23
World Junior Championships		19th	
Israeli Championships		1st	
JGP Austria		12th	
JGP Italy			10th
JGP Poland			20th
Bavarian Open	11th		
Bellu Memorial		1st	
European Youth Olympic Festival		5th	
Golden Bear of Zagreb	6th		
Ice Star	11th		
NRW Trophy	2nd		
Santa Claus Cup		11th	
Skate Celje		7th	
Volvo Open Cup	8th		

== Detailed results ==
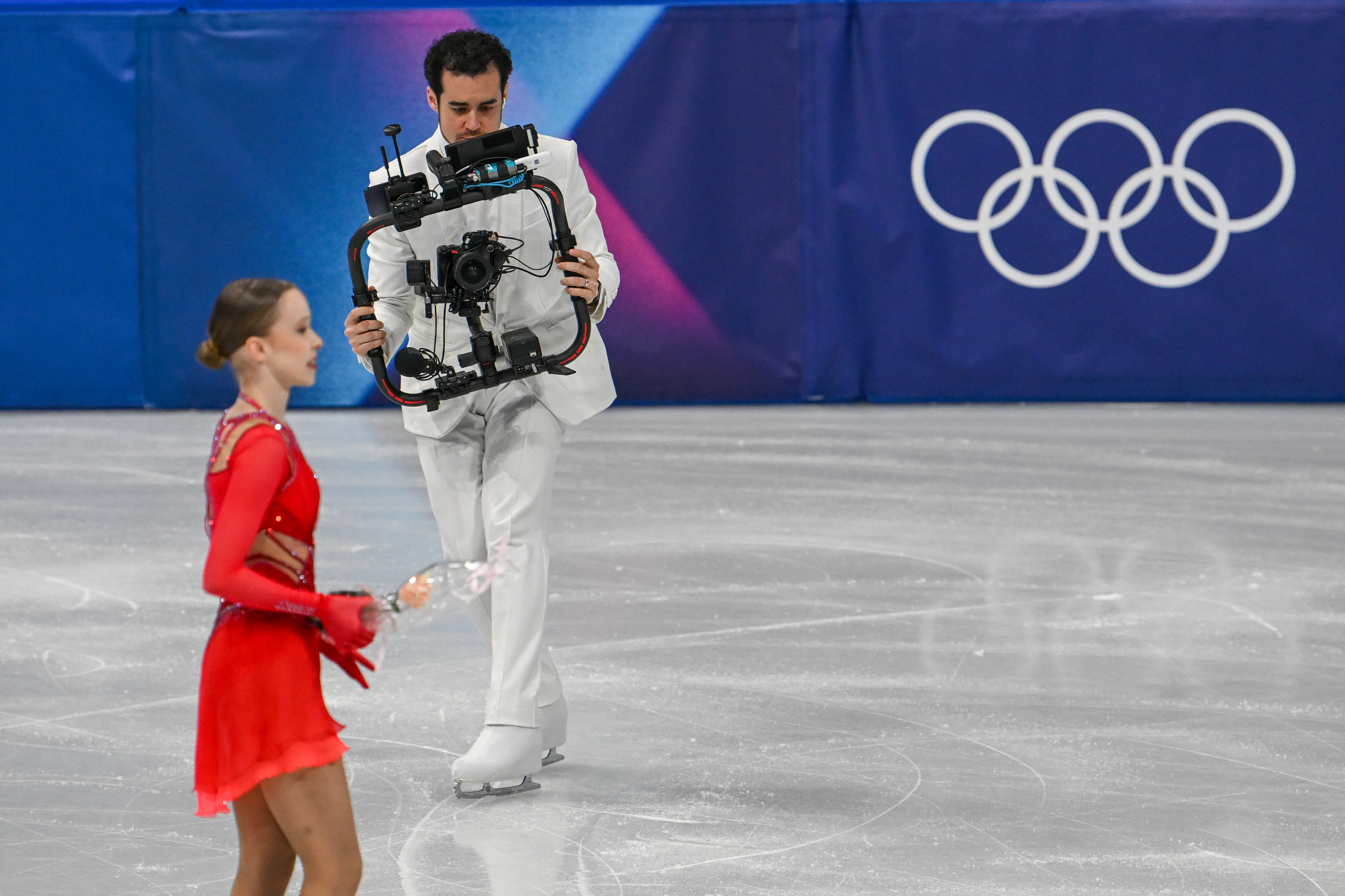
Mariia at the end of her free skate at the 2026 Winter Olympics

ISU personal best scores in the +5/-5 GOE System
Segment	Type	Score	Event
Total	TSS	185.80	2025 CS Trialeti Trophy
Short program	TSS	61.39	2025 CS Trialeti Trophy
Short program	TES	33.99	2025 CS Trialeti Trophy
Short program	PCS	27.40	2025 CS Trialeti Trophy
Free skating	TSS	124.41	2025 CS Trialeti Trophy
Free skating	TES	66.52	2025 CS Nepela Memorial
Free skating	PCS	58.60	2025 CS Trialeti Trophy

=== Senior level ===
Results in the 2022–23 season
Date	Event	SP		FS		Total	
Date	Event	P	Score	P	Score	P	Score
Nov 3–4, 2022	(Latvia) 2022 Volvo Open Cup	9	49.38	6	101.18	7	150.56
Nov 28 – Dec 4, 2022	(Hungary) 2022 Santa Claus Cup	6	48.39	1	110.16	2	158.55
Dec 14–15, 2022	(Israel) 2023 Israeli Championships	3	55.91	1	113.96	1	169.87
Feb 16–19, 2023	(Estonia) 2023 Tallink Hotels Cup	7	54.81	7	94.73	7	149.54
Feb 23–26, 2023	(Netherlands) 2023 International Challenge Cup	18	44.60	17	89.27	17	133.87

Results in the 2023–24 season
Date	Event	SP		FS		Total	
Date	Event	P	Score	P	Score	P	Score
Oct 18–22, 2023	(France) 2023 Trophée Métropole Nice Côte d'Azur	4	54.13	3	101.58	2	155.71
Nov 2–5, 2023	(Kazakhstan) 2023 CS Denis Ten Memorial Challenge	3	58.28	1	117.47	1	175.75
Dec 6–10, 2023	(Romania) 2023 EduSport Trophy	2	56.69	5	92.12	4	148.81
Jan 8–14, 2024	(Lithuania) 2024 European Championships	18	54.53	18	98.42	19	152.95
Mar 18–24, 2024	(Canada) 2024 World Championships	32	46.57	—N/a	—N/a	32	46.57
Apr 3–4, 2024	(Israel) 2024 Israeli Championships	1	57.29	1	108.96	1	166.25

Results in the 2024–25 season
Date	Event	SP		FS		Total	
Date	Event	P	Score	P	Score	P	Score
Oct 3–5, 2024	(Kazakhstan) 2024 CS Denis Ten Memorial Challenge	7	55.56	4	116.83	5	172.39
Oct 12–13, 2024	(United Kingdom) 2024 Tayside Trophy	2	54.93	1	102.25	1	157.18
Oct 25–27, 2024	(Slovakia) 2024 CS Nepela Memorial	3	57.07	2	115.87	2	172.94
Nov 12–17, 2024	(Germany) 2024 NRW Trophy	1	58.20	1	109.72	1	167.92
Dec 4–7, 2024	(Croatia) 2024 CS Golden Spin of Zagreb	5	59.08	8	109.22	6	168.30
Dec 11–12, 2024	(Israel) 2025 Israeli Championships	1	55.89	1	95.65	1	151.54
Jan 28 – Feb 2, 2025	(Estonia) 2025 European Championships	13	53.86	14	105.47	13	159.33
Feb 18–23, 2025	(Romania) 2025 Bellu Memorial	6	54.48	8	99.50	7	154.08
Mar 25–30, 2025	(United States) 2025 World Championships	19	56.96	16	110.14	16	167.10

Results in the 2025–26 season
Date	Event	SP		FS		Total	
Date	Event	P	Score	P	Score	P	Score
Sep 25–27, 2025	(Slovakia) 2025 CS Nepela Memorial	7	58.33	3	120.59	4	178.92
Oct 8–11, 2025	(Georgia (country)) 2025 CS Trialeti Trophy	2	61.39	2	124.41	2	185.80
Oct 31 – Nov 2, 2025	2025 Skate Canada International	10	57.40	8	114.35	8	171.75
Dec 10–11, 2025	(Israel) 2026 Israeli Championships	1	62.37	1	104.41	1	166.78
Jan 13–18, 2026	(United Kingdom) 2026 European Championships	20	52.40	20	96.11	21	148.51
Feb 17–19, 2026	(Italy) 2026 Winter Olympics	22	58.61	24	94.00	24	152.61

=== Junior level ===
Results in the 2022–23 season
Date	Event	SP		FS		Total	
Date	Event	P	Score	P	Score	P	Score
Oct 5–8, 2022	2022 JGP Poland	14	51.01	23	81.05	20	132.06
Oct 11–15, 2022	2022 JGP Italy	12	51.62	8	104.64	10	156.26

Olympic Games
Preceded by Evgeni Krasnopolski and Noa Szollos	Flagbearer for Israel; Milano Cortina 2026	Succeeded by
