= Georgii Reshtenko =

Russian-Czech figure skater (born 2002)

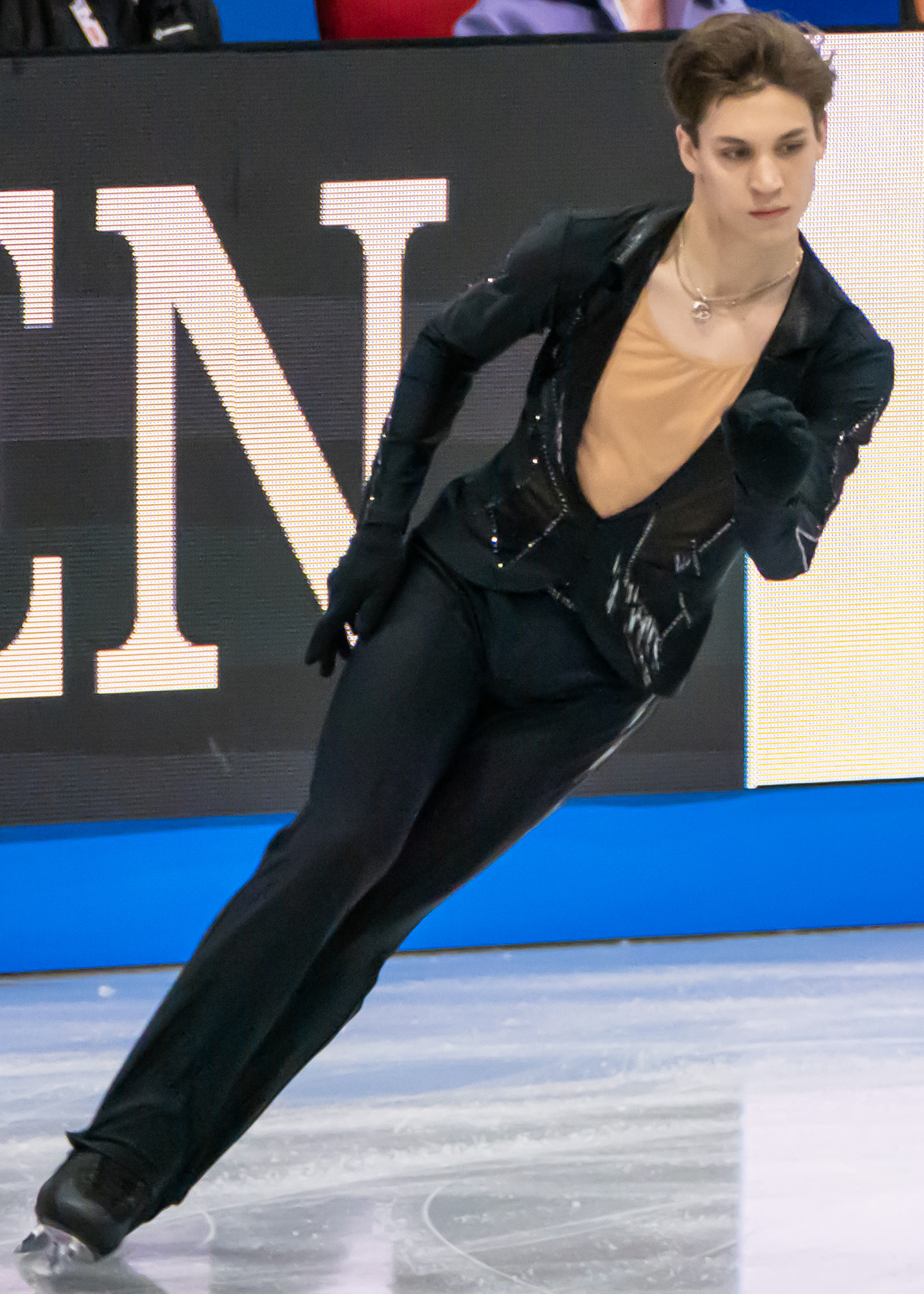
- Georgii Reshtenko at the 2025 World Championships

Personal information
- Native name: Георгий Рештенко
- Full name: Georgii Reshtenko
- Other names: Georgiy Reshtenko
- Born: 19 December 2002 (age 23) Saint Petersburg, Russia
- Home town: Prague, Czech Republic
- Height: 1.81 m (5 ft 11 1/2 in)

Figure skating career
- Country: Czech Republic (since 2018); Russia (2015–17)
- Discipline: Men's singles
- Coach: Michal Březina; Adam Solya
- Skating club: Tomáš Verner Academy, Prague
- Began skating: 2006

Medal record
European Championships
Bronze medal – third place	2026 Sheffield	Singles
Czech Championships
Gold medal – first place	2024 Turnov	Singles
Gold medal – first place	2025 Cieszyn	Singles
Gold medal – first place	2026 Presov	Singles
Silver medal – second place	2022 Spišská Nová Ves	Singles
Silver medal – second place	2023 Budapest	Singles
Bronze medal – third place	2021 Cieszyn	Singles

Georgii Reshtenko (Russian: Георгий Рештенко, Czech: Georgij Reštenko; born 19 December 2002) is Russian-Czech figure skater, competing in men's singles. Since 2017, he has represented the Czech Republic. He is the 2026 European Championship bronze medalist and a three-time Czech national champion (2024–26).

== Personal life ==
Reshtenko was born on 19 December 2002, in Saint Petersburg, Russia. In addition to figure skating, he also enjoys playing football, tennis, and the violin.

In April 2023, Reshtenko spoke out against the poor treatment of Russian immigrants across Europe in the wake of the Russian invasion of Ukraine and the failure to separate politicians from ordinary people.

== Career ==
=== Early career ===
Reshtenko began figure skating in 2006 at the age of three. He was first coached by Olga Arseneva, Alexander Rachinskii, and Anastasia Bunina until the age of nine when he joined Evgeni Rukavicin's group of skaters with Roman Usatov becoming his main coach. He won the 2015 Figure Skating Championship of St. Petersburg and the 2017 Northwest Region of Russia Competition.

At the age of fifteen, however, Reshtenko's father got a new job that involved the family relocating to Prague. Now living in the Czech Republic, Reshtenko made the decision to begin representing the country. His first coach in Prague was Jakub Štrobl before eventually switching to Michal Matloch prior to the 2019–20 figure skating season.

He finished eighth in his debut at the 2019 Four National Championships. That same year, Reshtenko enrolled at the figure skating academy of Tomáš Verner.

=== 2019–20 season: Junior Grand Prix debut ===
Debuting on the Junior Grand Prix circuit, Reshtenko finished thirteenth at 2019 JGP Russia. He subsequently competed on the junior level at the 2019 Prague Ice Cup where he won the silver medal. Going on to compete on the senior level at the 2019 CS Golden Spin of Zagreb, where he placed eighteenth.

Reshtenko then ended the season by finishing sixth at the 2020 Four National Championships.

=== 2020–21 season ===
Reshtenko started the season by finishing fourth at the 2020 Santa Claus Cup and fifth at the 2021 Four National Championships. He then ended the season by finishing fourteenth at the 2021 International Challenge Cup.

=== 2021–22 season ===
Prior to the season, it was announced that while continuing to work with Michal Matloch in Prague, Reshtenko would also make trips to St. Petersburg, Russia, to be trained by former coach, Roman Usatov. While competing on the 2021–22 ISU Junior Grand Prix circuit, Reshtenko placed eleventh at 2021 JGP Slovakia and fifth at 2021 JGP Slovenia.

Subsequently, competing on the 2021–22 ISU Challenger Series, he finished eighth at the 2021 CS Denis Ten Memorial Challenge, twenty-first at the 2021 CS Warsaw Cup, and ninth at the 2021 CS Golden Spin of Zagreb. Reshtenko then went on to compete at the 2022 Four National Championships, where he won the silver medal behind Matyáš Bělohradský.

In February, following the Russian invasion of Ukraine, Reshtenko ended his working relationship with Usatov and stopped training in Russia at the request of the Czech Figure Skating Association.

Selected to represent the Czech Republic at the 2022 World Junior Championships in Tallinn, Estonia, Reshtenko finished eleventh overall.

Following the season's end, it was later announced that Reshtenko had begun dividing his time training on his own in Prague while also training under Michal Březina in Irvine, California, in the United States.

=== 2022–23 season: European and World Championship debut ===
In June 2022, shortly after his move to the United States, Reshtenko broke his leg and twisted his ankle, forcing him to stay off the ice for four months. He did not return to competition until December of that year, where Reshtenko finished seventh at the 2023 Four National Championships.

Selected to compete at the 2023 European Championships in Espoo, Finland, Reshtenko placed twenty-sixth in the short program and failed to advance to the free skate segment. He also went on to compete at the 2023 World Championships in Saitama, Japan, placing thirty-fourth in the short program and failing to qualify for the free skate segment.

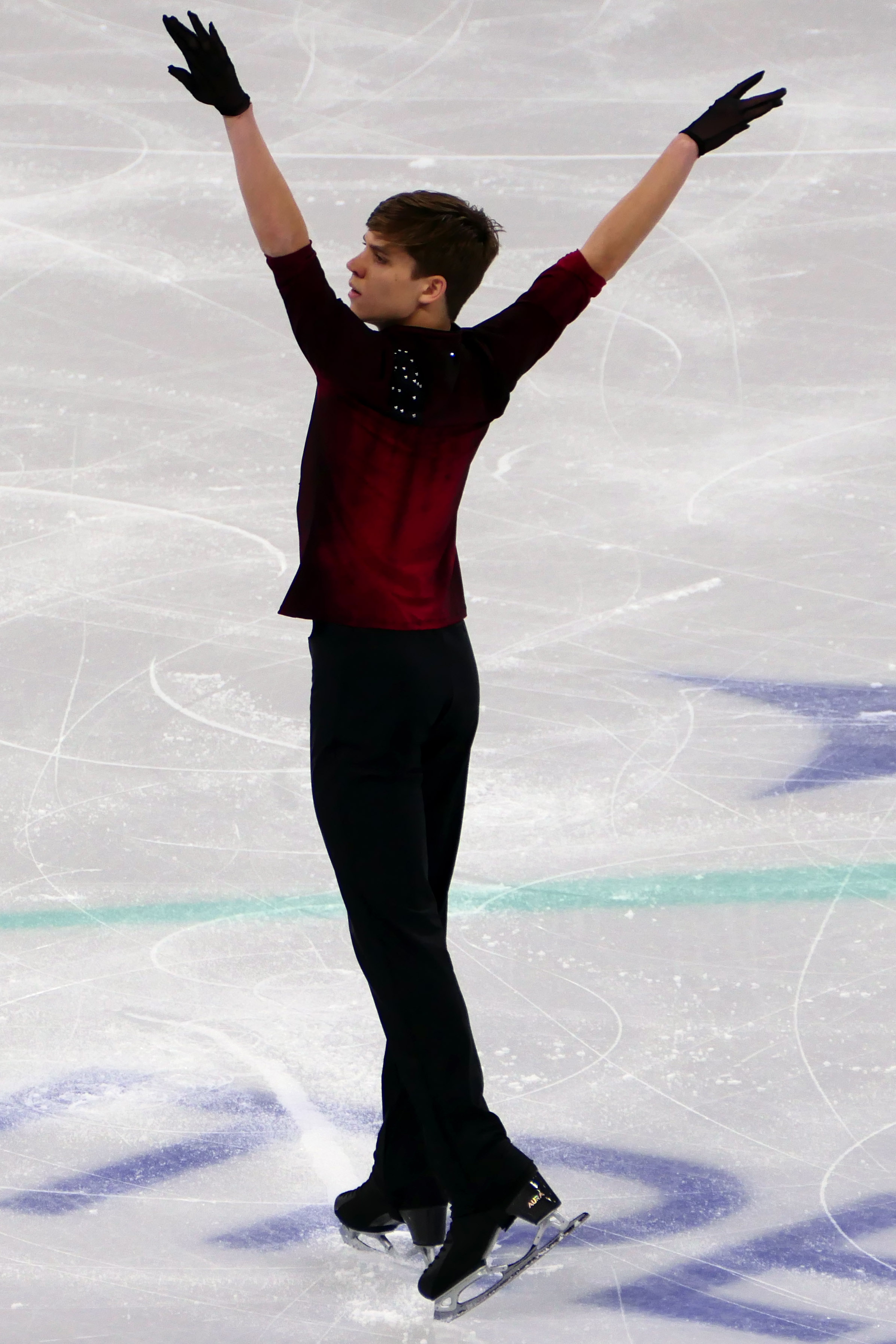
Reshtenko performing his short program at the 2024 World Championships

Reshtenko then closed the season with a fifth-place finish at the 2023 Triglav Trophy.

=== 2023–24 season: Czech national champion ===
Reshtenko began the season by finishing eleventh at the 2023 Cranberry Cup International. Subsequently, competing on the 2023–24 ISU Challenger Series, he placed ninth at the 2023 Lombardia Trophy and while he did complete his short program, he withdrew before the free skate.

At the 2024 Four National Championships, Reshtenko won the silver medal. Going on to compete at the 2024 European Championships, Reshtenko scored personal bests in all competition segments, finishing ninth overall. Following that event, Reshtenko competed at the 2024 Bavarian Open, where he won the silver mnedal.

Selected to compete at the 2024 World Championships, Reshtenko place thirty-sixth in the short program, but failed to advance to the free skate segment.

=== 2024–25 season ===
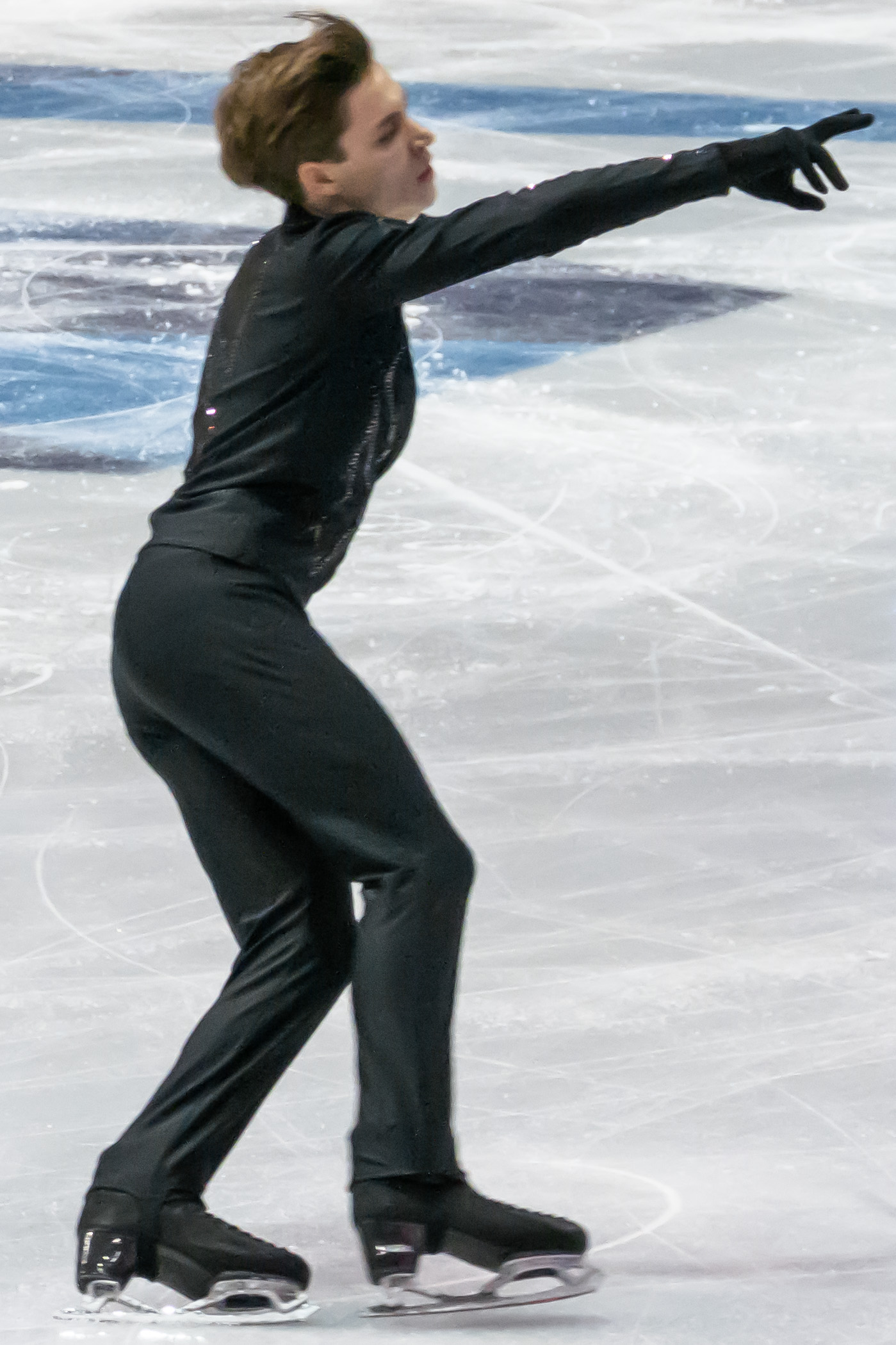
Reshtenko performing his short program at the 2025 World Championships

Reshtenko began the season by finishing thirteenth at the 2024 Nebelhorn Trophy, sixth at the 2024 Tayside Trophy, eighth at the 2024 Nepela Memorial, and fourth at the 2024 Volvo Open Cup.

In December, Reshtenko won the silver medal at the 2025 Four National Championships. The following month, he placed twenty-third at the 2025 European Championships.

In March, he competed at the 2025 World Championships, held in Boston, Massachusetts, in the United States. He placed thirty-first in the short program and did not advance to the free skate.

=== 2025–26 season: European bronze ===
Reshtenko opened the season by competing at the ISU Skate to Milano, the final qualifying event for the 2026 Winter Olympics, where the top five men's singles skaters were awarded an Olympic berth. Reshtenko finished the event in eighth place.

He went on to compete at three Challenger Series events, placing thirteenth at the 2025 CS Trialeti Trophy, tenth at the 2025 CS Tallinn Trophy, and eleventh at the 2025 CS Golden Spin of Zagreb.

In late December, he won the bronze medal at the 2026 Four National Championships. The following month, he unexpectedly won the bronze medal at the 2026 European Figure Skating Championships after placing eighth in the short program and third in the free skate. "I barely made the free skate at Europeans last year," he said after the event. "I was 23rd, and I am now, you know, third. I am so happy about it."

In March, Reshtenko completed his season at the 2026 World Championships. He placed twentieth in the short program and twenty-first in the free skate, finishing twenty-second overall.

=== 2026–27 season ===
Reshtenko began the new season by placing eighteenth at the 2026 CS Nepela Memorial. In October, Reshtenko made his Grand Prix debut at the 2026 Skate Canada International where he placed seventh overall.

== Programs ==
Season	Short program	Free skate	Exhibition	Ref.
2018–19	Concerto 4 — Adagio and Rondo By Niccolò Paganini Choreo. by Nikita Mikhailov & Sergej Gherciu	The Greatest Showman By Benj Pasek & Justin Paul; "The Greatest Show" Performed by Hugh Jackman, Keala Settle, BriaAndChrissy, Zac Efron & Zendaya; A Million Dreams Performed by Ziv Zaifman, Hugh Jackman & Michelle Williams Choreo. by Nikita Mikhailov & Sergej Gherciu		
2019–20	Concerto 4 — Adagio and Rondo By Niccolò Paganini Choreo. by Nikita Mikhailov & Sergej Gherciu	The Greatest Showman By Benj Pasek & Justin Paul; "The Greatest Show" Performed by Hugh Jackman, Keala Settle, BriaAndChrissy, Zac Efron & Zendaya; A Million Dreams Performed by Ziv Zaifman, Hugh Jackman & Michelle Williams Choreo. by Nikita Mikhailov & Sergej Gherciu		
2020–21	Love Is Gone By Peter Cincotti, Bernard Buchannan, Christopher E. Martin & Jonathan Burks Choreo. by Nikita Mikhailov & Petr Bidař	From Ear to Ear (The Joker's Song) By JT Music; How You Like Me Now? By The Heavy Performed by Tony Lucca Choreo. by Nikita Mikhailov & Petr Bidař		
2021–22	Love Is Gone By Peter Cincotti, Bernard Buchannan, Christopher E. Martin & Jonathan Burks Choreo. by Nikita Mikhailov & Petr Bidař	From Ear to Ear (The Joker's Song) By JT Music; How You Like Me Now? By The Heavy Performed by Tony Lucca Choreo. by Nikita Mikhailov & Petr Bidař		
2022–23	"Apologize" Timbaland & OneRepublic Choreo. by Ivan Righini	The Man from U.N.C.L.E.; His Name Is Napoleon Solo; Escape from East Berlin; Circular Story By Daniel Pemberton Choreo. by Ivan Righini		
2023–24	Triple Concerto In C Major, Op. 56: I. Allegro By Ludwig van Beethoven Choreo. by Adam Solya	The Man from U.N.C.L.E.; His Name Is Napoleon Solo; Escape from East Berlin; Circular Story By Daniel Pemberton Choreo. by Ivan Righini		
2024–25	Parisienne Walkways By Gary Moore Choreo. by Adam Solya	Now We Are Free (from Gladiator) By Hans Zimmer & Lisa Gerrard; Strength of a Thousand Men By Two Steps from Hell Choreo. by Adam Solya		
2025–26	Scratch By Power-Haus ft. Duomo; Shadow Hunter By Power-Haus; Moriarty By Power-Haus ft. Sebastian Pecznik & Duomo Choreo. by Adam Solya	Kingsman: The Secret Service; Manners Maketh Man; Valentine; Finale By Henry Jackman & Matthew Margeson Choreo. by Adam Solya	It's Alright (The Guvnor Mix) By East 17; Alright By DJ Smurf	
2026–27	Unchained Melody (Film mix) by Elvis Presley & JXL; A Little less Conversation (JXL Radio Edit Remix) by Elvis Presley choreo. by Shae-Lynn Bourne	Spartacus Suite No. 2: Adagio of Phrygia and Spartacus; Spartacus Procession by Aram Khachaturian choreo. by Adam Solya		

== Competitive highlights ==
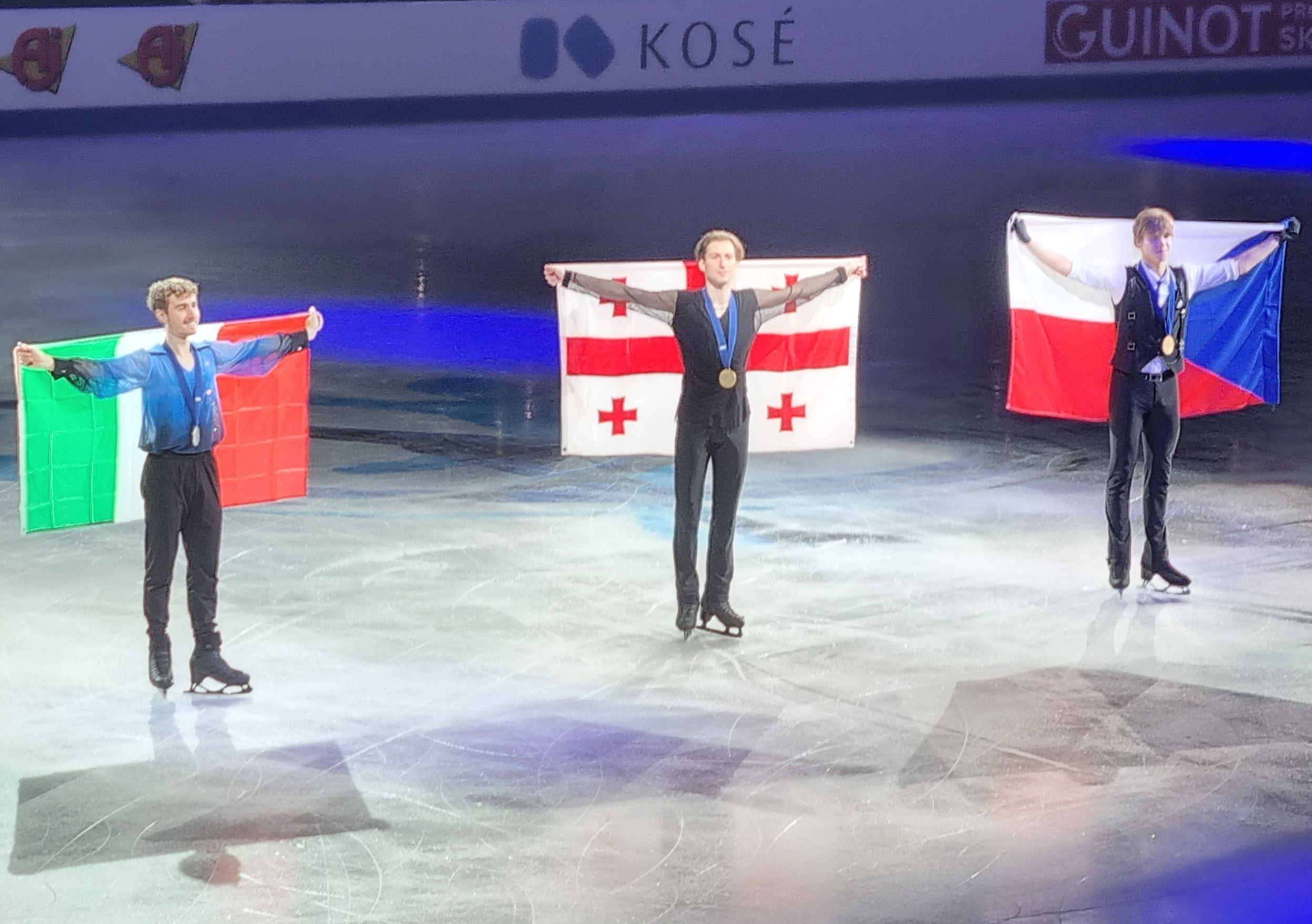
Reshtenko (right) at the 2026 European Championships medal ceremony alongside Matteo Rizzo (left) and Nika Egadze (Middle)

- JGP – Event of the ISU Junior Grand Prix Series
- CS – Event of the ISU Challenger Series
- TBD – Assigned
- WD – Withdrew from competition

Competition placements at senior level
Season	2018–19	2019–20	2020–21	2021–22	2022–23	2023–24	2024–25	2025–26	2026–27
World Championships					34th	36th	31st	22nd	
European Championships					26th	9th	23rd	3rd	
Czech Championships	6th	6th	3rd	2nd	2nd	1st	1st	1st	
Four Nationals Championships	8th	6th	5th	2nd	7th	2nd	2nd	3rd	
GP Skate America									11th
GP Skate Canada									7th
CS Denis Ten Memorial				8th					
CS Finlandia Trophy						WD			
CS Golden Spin of Zagreb	20th	18th		9th				11th	
CS Lombardia Trophy						9th			
CS Nebelhorn Trophy							13th		
CS Nepela Memorial							8th		18th
CS Tallinn Trophy								10th	
CS Trialeti Trophy								13th	
CS Triglav Trophy					5th				
CS Warsaw Cup				21st					
CS Alpen Trophy	23rd								
Challenge Cup			14th						
Christmas Cup	6th								
Cranberry Cup						11th			
Santa Claus Cup			4th						
Skate to Milano								8th	
Tayside Trophy							6th		
Volvo Open Cup							4th		
Bavarian Open						2nd			

Competition placements at junior level
Season	2018–19	2019–20	2021–22
World Junior Championships			11th
JGP Russia		13th	
JGP Slovakia			11th
JGP Slovenia			5th
Prague Ice Cup	7th	2nd	

== Detailed results ==
ISU personal best scores in the +5/-5 GOE System
Segment	Type	Score	Event
Total	TSS	238.27	2026 European Championships
Short program	TSS	78.62	2026 European Championships
Short program	TES	45.15	2026 European Championships
Short program	PCS	35.67	2026 World Championships
Free skating	TSS	159.65	2026 European Championships
Free skating	TES	89.02	2026 European Championships
Free skating	PCS	71.60	2021 CS Golden Spin of Zagreb

=== Senior level ===
Results in the 2018–19 season
Date	Event	SP		FS		Total	
Date	Event	P	Score	P	Score	P	Score
11–18 Nov 2018	(Austria) 2018 CS Alpen Trophy	23	48.70	22	83.90	23	132.60
29 Nov – 2 Dec 2018	(Hungary) 2018 Christmas Cup	9	44.45	4	96.91	6	141.36
5–8 Dec 2018	(Croatia) 2018 CS Golden Spin of Zagreb	21	50.21	20	86.17	20	136.38
14–15 Dec 2018	(Hungary) 2019 Four Nationals Championships	4	61.45	10	103.09	8	164.54
14–15 Dec 2018	(Hungary) 2019 Czech Championships (Note: The Czech Championships are contested as part of the Four Nationals Championships.)	3	—N/a	7	—N/a	6	—N/a

Results in the 2019–20 season
Date	Event	SP		FS		Total	
Date	Event	P	Score	P	Score	P	Score
4–7 Dec 2019	(Croatia) 2019 CS Golden Spin of Zagreb	21	59.63	15	123.98	18	183.61
13–14 Dec 2019	(Czech Republic) 2020 Four Nationals Championships	5	62.40	5	121.11	6	183.51
13–14 Dec 2019	(Czech Republic) 2020 Czech Championships	5	—N/a	5	—N/a	6	—N/a

Results in the 2020–21 season
Date	Event	SP		FS		Total	
Date	Event	P	Score	P	Score	P	Score
26–29 Nov 2020	(Hungary) 2020 Santa Claus Cup	5	47.32	4	106.31	4	153.63
10–12 Dec 2020	(Poland) 2021 Four Nationals Championships	5	47.08	5	103.88	5	150.96
10–12 Dec 2020	(Poland) 2021 Czech Championships	3	—N/a	3	—N/a	3	—N/a
26–28 Feb 2021	(Netherlands) 2021 Challenge Cup	9	64.91	15	109.44	14	174.35

Results in the 2022–23 season
Date	Event	SP		FS		Total	
Date	Event	P	Score	P	Score	P	Score
16–18 Dec 2022	(Hungary) 2023 Four Nationals Championships	8	57.74	7	110.48	7	168.22
16–18 Dec 2022	(Hungary) 2023 Czech Championships	2	—N/a	2	—N/a	2	—N/a
23–29 Jan 2023	(Finland) 2023 European Championships	26	54.52	—N/a	—N/a	26	54.52
20–26 Mar 2023	(Japan) 2023 World Championships	34	59.93	—N/a	—N/a	34	59.93
12–16 Apr 2023	(Slovenia) 2023 Triglav Trophy	6	57.80	4	118.95	5	176.75

Results in the 2023-24 season
Date	Event	SP		FS		Total	
Date	Event	P	Score	P	Score	P	Score
11–14 Aug 2023	(United States) 2023 Cranberry Cup International	6	69.61	14	110.99	11	180.60
8–10 Sep 2023	(Italy) 2023 CS Lombardia Trophy	9	60.85	8	123.02	9	183.87
6–8 Oct 2023	(Finland) 2023 CS Finlandia Trophy	10	68.49	—N/a	—N/a	–	WD
14–16 Dec 2023	(Czech Republic) 2024 Four Nationals Championships	2	68.51	2	132.66	2	201.17
14–16 Dec 2023	(Czech Republic) 2024 Czech Championships	1	—N/a	1	—N/a	1	—N/a
8–14 Jan 2024	(Lithuania) 2024 European Championships	13	72.74	8	153.93	9	226.67
30 Jan – 4 Feb 2024	(Germany) 2024 Bavarian Open	2	78.71	2	156.01	2	234.72
18–24 Mar 2024	(Canada) 2024 World Championships	36	65.35	—N/a	—N/a	36	65.35

Results in the 2024–25 season
Date	Event	SP		FS		Total	
Date	Event	P	Score	P	Score	P	Score
18–21 Sep 2024	(Germany) 2024 CS Nebelhorn Trophy	7	72.86	14	118.39	13	191.25
12–13 Oct 2024	(United Kingdom) 2024 Tayside Trophy	8	55.27	6	119.60	6	174.87
25–27 Oct 2024	(Slovakia) 2024 CS Nepela Memorial	5	75.59	11	104.57	8	180.16
31 Oct – 3 Nov 2024	(Latvia) 53rd Volvo Open Cup	8	62.14	4	125.54	4	187.68
13–15 Dec 2024	(Poland) 2025 Four Nationals Championships	4	71.63	2	152.46	2	224.09
13–15 Dec 2024	(Poland) 2025 Czech Championships	1	—N/a	1	—N/a	1	—N/a
28 Jan – 2 Feb 2025	(Estonia) 2025 European Championships	20	68.05	24	107.18	23	175.23
24–30 Mar 2025	(United States) 2025 World Championships	31	68.61	—N/a	—N/a	31	68.61

Results in the 2025-26 season
Date	Event	SP		FS		Total	
Date	Event	P	Score	P	Score	P	Score
18–21 Sep 2025	(China) 2025 ISU Skate to Milano	7	71.03	6	142.03	8	213.06
8–11 Oct 2025	(Georgia (country)) 2025 CS Trialeti Trophy	13	64.98	14	106.45	14	171.43
25–30 Nov 2025	(Estonia) 2025 CS Tallinn Trophy	8	74.03	18	117.33	10	191.36
3–6 Dec 2025	(Croatia) 2025 CS Golden Spin of Zagreb	12	71.74	11	129.53	11	201.27
11–13 Dec 2025	(Slovakia) 2026 Four Nationals Championships	3	71.08	2	133.58	3	204.66
11–13 Dec 2025	(Czech Republic) 2026 Czech Championships	1	—N/a	1	—N/a	1	—N/a
13–18 Jan 2025	(United Kingdom) 2026 European Championships	8	78.62	3	159.65	3	238.27
24–29 Mar 2026	(Czech Republic) 2026 World Championships	20	75.14	20	132.02	22	207.16

Results in the 2026-27 season
Date	Event	SP		FS		Total	
Date	Event	P	Score	P	Score	P	Score
24–27 Sep 2026	(Slovakia) 2026 CS Nepela Memorial	19	59.98	17	120.13	18	180.11
30 Oct – 1 Nov 2026	2026 Skate Canada International	8	76.43	7	140.51	7	216.94
13–15 Nov, 2026	(United States) 2026 Skate America	11	65.77	9	140.49	11	206.26
