= 2026 European Figure Skating Championships =

European figure skating competition

- Type: ISU Championship
- Date: 13 – 18 January
- Season: 2025–26
- Location: Sheffield, England, United Kingdom
- Host: British Ice Skating
- Venue: Utilita Arena Sheffield

Champions
- Men's singles: (Georgia (country)) Nika Egadze
- Women's singles: (Estonia) Niina Petrõkina
- Pairs: (Georgia (country)) Anastasiia Metelkina and Luka Berulava
- Ice dance: (France) Laurence Fournier Beaudry and Guillaume Cizeron
- Previous: 2025 European Championships
- Next: 2027 European Championships

The 2026 European Figure Skating Championships were held from 13 to 18 January at the Utilita Arena Sheffield in Sheffield, England, in the United Kingdom. Medals were awarded in men's singles, women's singles, pair skating, and ice dance. The competition also determined the entry quotas for each skating federation to the 2027 European Championships. Nika Egadze of Georgia won the men's event, Niina Petrõkina of Estonia won the women's event, Anastasiia Metelkina and Luka Berulava of Georgia won the pairs event, and Laurence Fournier Beaudry and Guillaume Cizeron of France won the ice dance event. With his sixth victory, Cizeron tied the record held by Lyudmila Pakhomova and Aleksandr Gorshkov of the Soviet Union for winning the most European Championship titles in ice dance, although he won his six titles with different partners.

== Background ==
The European Figure Skating Championships are an annual figure skating competition sanctioned by the International Skating Union (ISU). They are the oldest competition in figure skating. The first European Championships were held in 1891 in Hamburg, Germany. Only eligible skaters from ISU member countries in Europe are allowed to compete, while skaters from countries outside of Europe instead compete at the Four Continents Figure Skating Championships. The 2026 European Championships were held from 13 to 18 January at the Utilita Arena Sheffield in Sheffield, England, in the United Kingdom.

== Qualification ==
The number of entries from each nation for the 2026 European Championships was based on the results of the 2025 European Championships. These nations were eligible to enter more than one skater or team in the indicated disciplines. Skaters from Russia and Belarus were banned from participating "until further notice" due to the 2022 Russian invasion of Ukraine.

Number of entries per discipline
Spots	Men	Women	Pairs	Ice dance
3	Italy	Estonia; Georgia; Italy	Germany; Italy	Finland; France
2	Estonia; France; Georgia; Latvia; Poland; Switzerland	Belgium; France; Great Britain; Poland; Romania; Switzerland	France; Georgia; Great Britain; Hungary; Netherlands; Poland	Czech Republic; Georgia; Great Britain; Italy; Lithuania; Spain

== Schedule ==
Date	Time	Discipline	Segment
14 January	12:55	Pairs	Short Program
14 January	17:00	Women	Short Program
15 January	13:00	Men	Short Program
15 January	19:00	Pairs	Free Skate
16 January	12:00	Ice Dance	Rhythm Dance
16 January	18:00	Women	Free Skate
17 January	13:00	Men	Free Skate
17 January	18:30	Ice Dance	Free Dance
18 January	15:00	—	Exhibition
All times are local (UTC±0:00)

== Changes to preliminary assignments ==
The International Skating Union published the initial list of entrants on 17 December 2025.

Date	Discipline	Withdrew	Added	Notes	Ref.
22 December	Men	(France); Adam Siao Him Fa	(France); François Pitot	—N/a	
22 December	Pairs	(Italy); Lucrezia Beccari; Matteo Guarise	(Italy); Irma Caldara; Riccardo Maglio	—N/a	
7 January	Men	(Hungary); Aleksandr Vlasenko	—N/a	—N/a	
10 January	Pairs	(Italy); Sara Conti; Niccolò Macii	—N/a	Injury (Conti)	
13 January	Men	(Armenia); Semen Daniliants	—N/a	Visa issues	
13 January	Pairs	(Armenia); Karina Akopova; Nikita Rakhmanin	—N/a	Visa issues	
13 January	Ice dance	(Germany); Jennifer Janse van Rensburg; Benjamin Steffan	(Germany); Charise Matthaei; Max Liebers	Health reasons	
15 January	Men	(Azerbaijan); Vladimir Litvintsev	—N/a		
15 January	Ice dance	(Czech Republic); Kateřina Mrázková; Daniel Mrázek	—N/a		
15 January	Ice dance	(Georgia (country)); Maria Kazakova; Vladislav Kasinskij	—N/a		

== Judging ==
All of the technical elements in any figure skating performance – such as jumps and spins – were assigned a predetermined base point value and then scored by a panel of nine judges on a scale from –5 to 5 based on their quality of execution. The judging panel's Grade of Execution (GOE) was determined by calculating the trimmed mean (the average after discarding the highest and lowest scores), and this GOE was added to the base value to come up with the final score for each element. The panel's scores for all elements were added together to generate a total elements score. At the same time, the judges evaluated each performance based on three program components – skating skills, presentation, and composition – and assigned a score from 0.25 to 10 in 0.25 point increments. The judging panel's final score for each program component was also determined by calculating the trimmed mean. Those scores were then multiplied by the factor shown on the following chart; the results were added together to generate a total program component score.

Program component factoring
Discipline	Short program or Rhythm dance	Free skate or Free dance
Men	1.67	3.33
Women	1.33	2.67
Pairs	1.33	2.67
Ice dance	1.33	2.00

Deductions were applied for certain violations like time infractions, stops and restarts, or falls. The total elements score and total program component score were added together, minus any deductions, to generate a final performance score for each skater or team.

== Medal summary ==
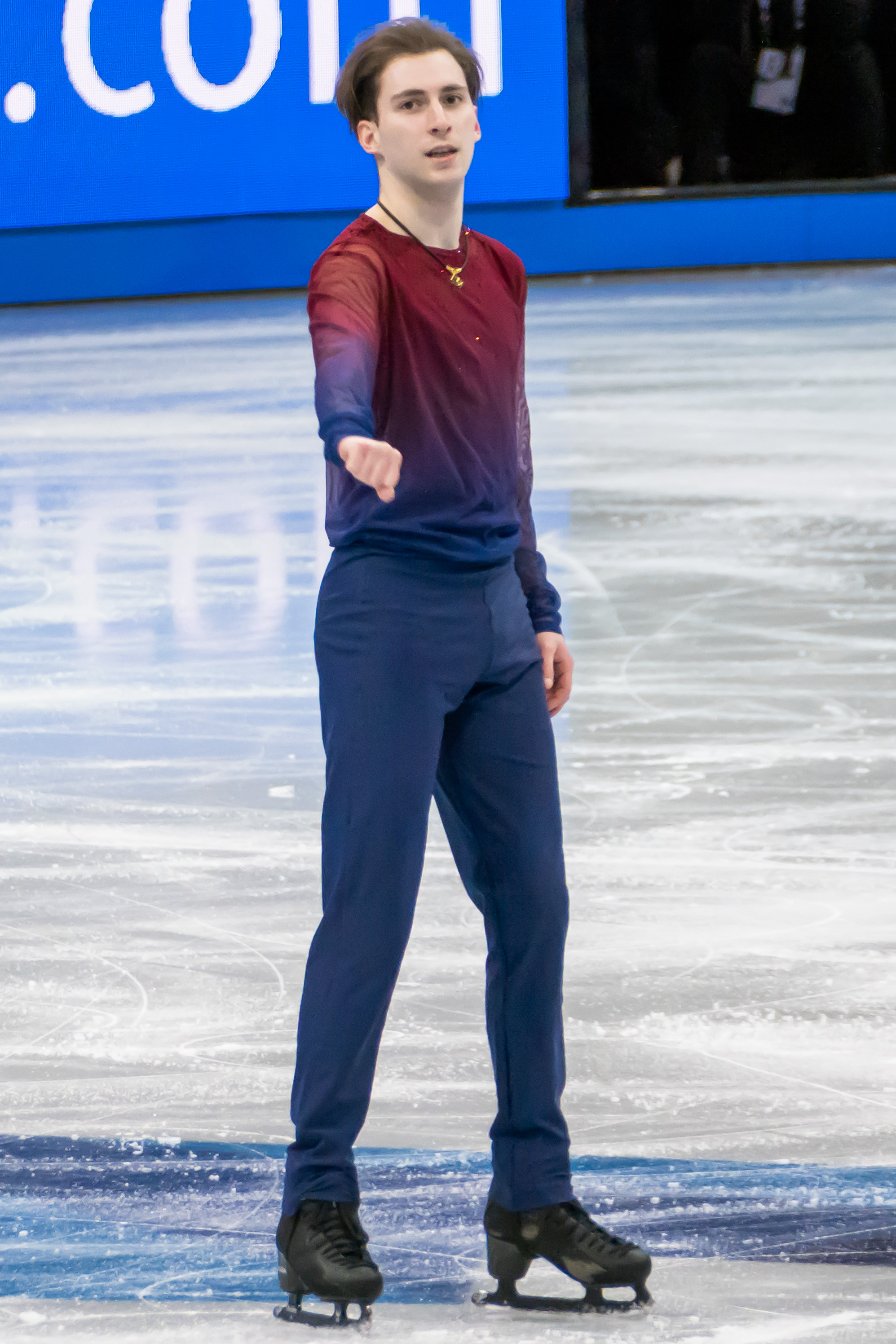
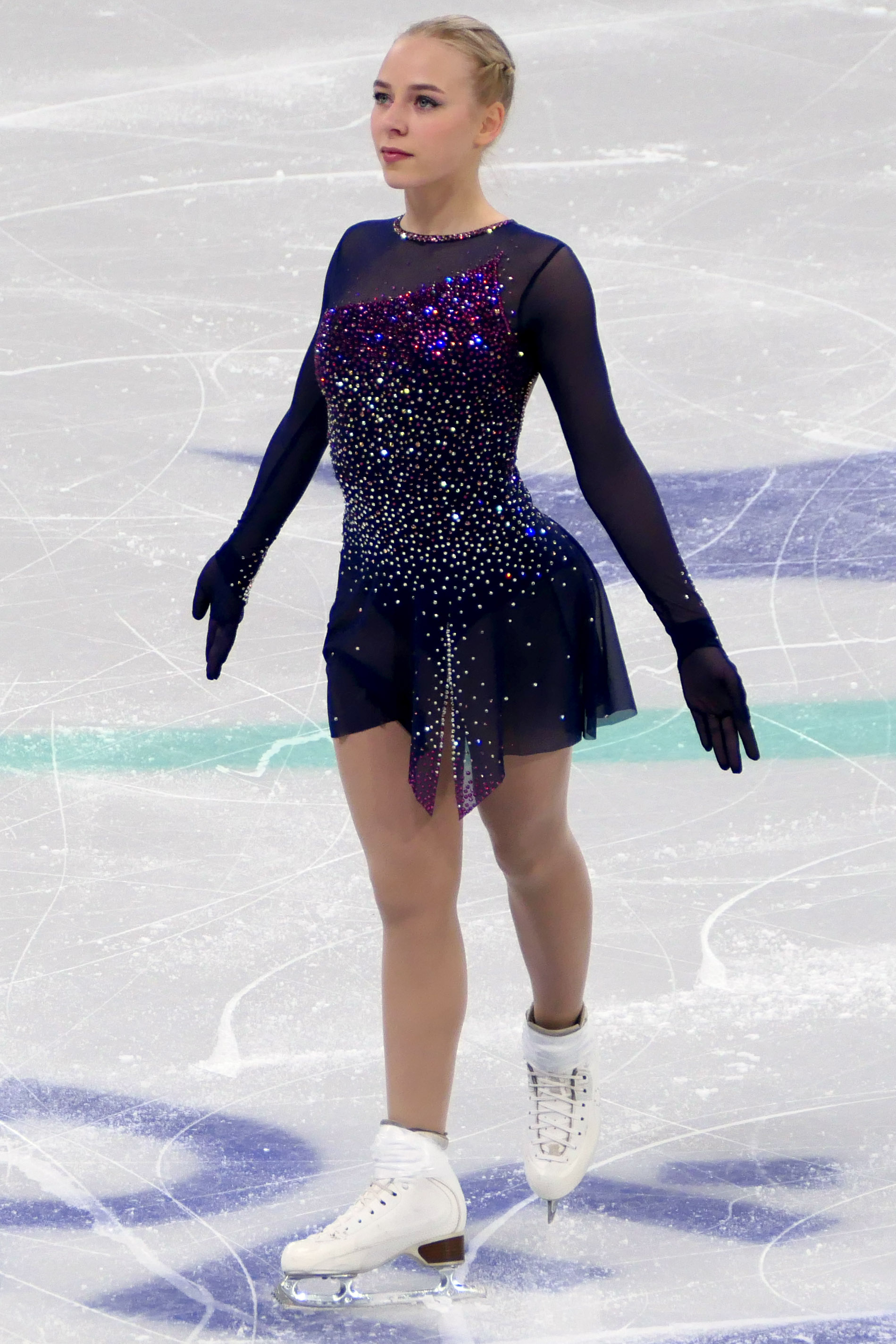
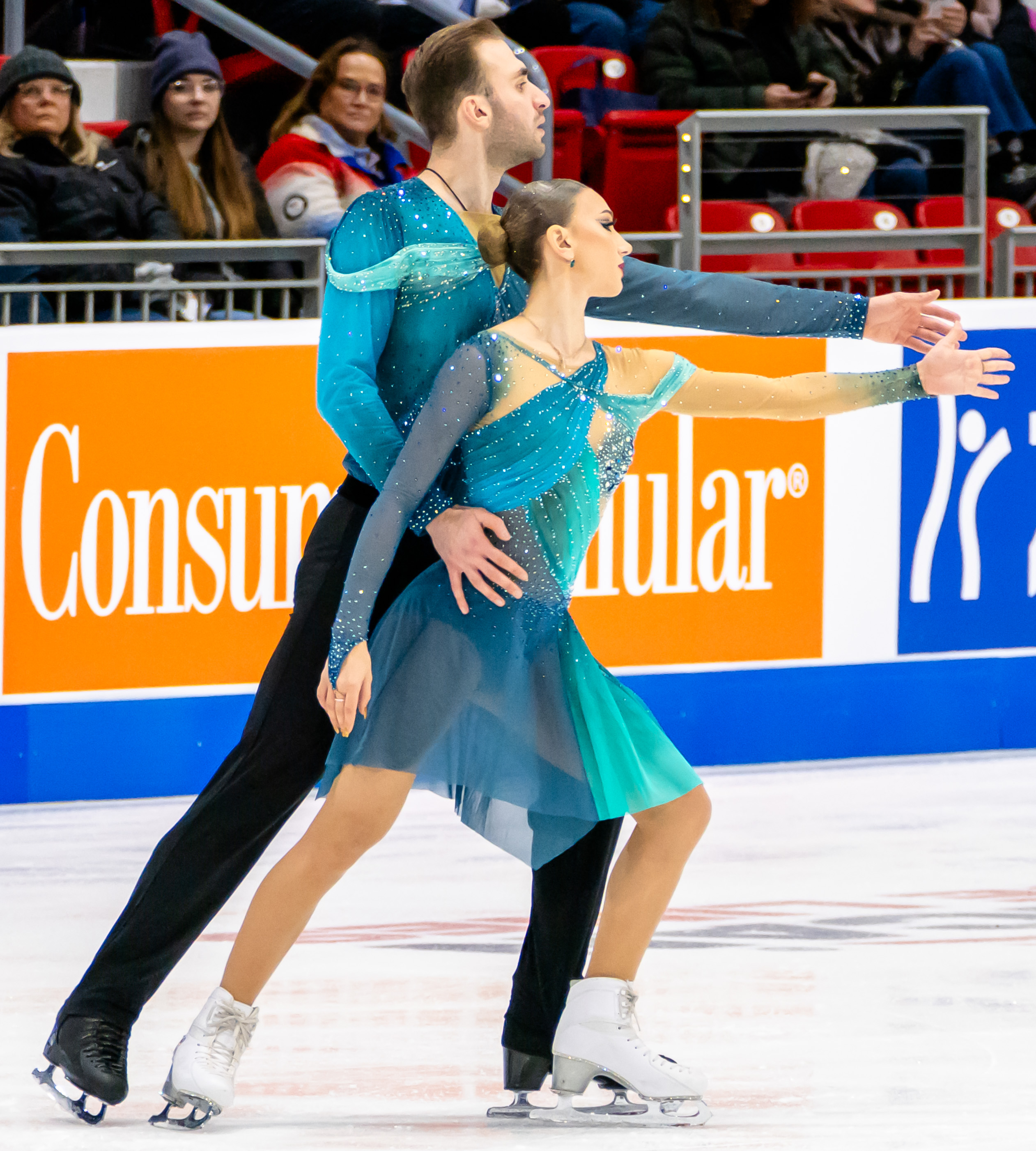
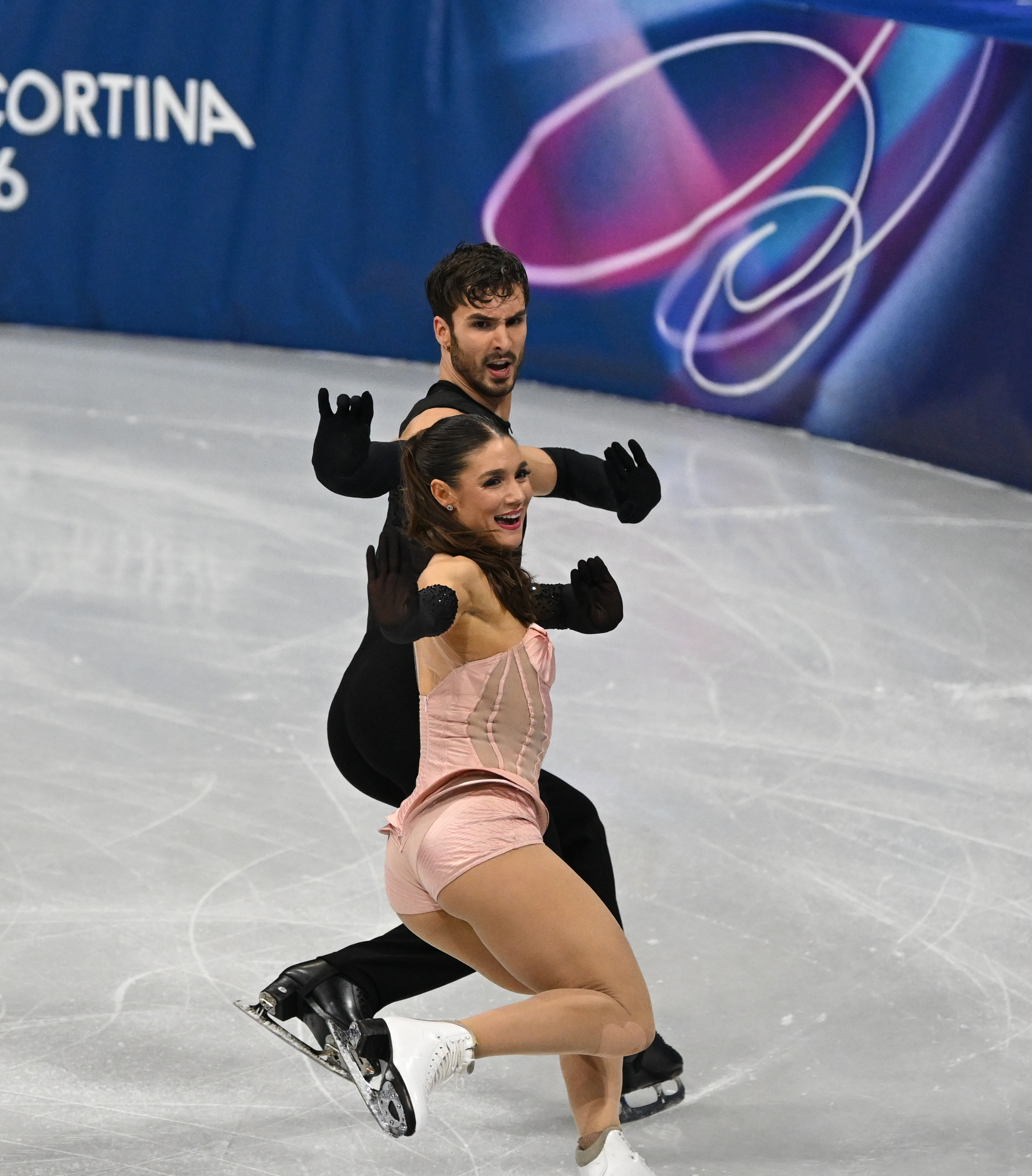
The 2026 European figure skating champions: Nika Egadze of Georgia (men's singles); Niina Petrõkina of Estonia (women's singles); Anastasiia Metelkina and Luka Berulava of Georgia (pair skating); and Laurence Fournier Beaudry and Guillaume Cizeron of France (ice dance)

=== Medalists ===
Medals awarded to the skaters who achieved the highest overall placements in each discipline:

Medal recipients
Discipline	Gold	Silver	Bronze
Men	(Georgia (country)); Nika Egadze	(Italy); Matteo Rizzo	(Czech Republic); Georgii Reshtenko
Women	(Estonia); Niina Petrõkina	(Belgium); Loena Hendrickx	(Italy); Lara Naki Gutmann
Pairs	(Georgia (country)); Anastasiia Metelkina; Luka Berulava	(Germany); Minerva Fabienne Hase; Nikita Volodin	(Hungary); Maria Pavlova; Alexei Sviatchenko
Ice dance	(France); Laurence Fournier Beaudry; Guillaume Cizeron	(Italy); Charlène Guignard; Marco Fabbri	(United Kingdom); Lilah Fear; Lewis Gibson

Small medals awarded to the skaters who achieved the highest short program or rhythm dance placements in each discipline:

Small medal recipients for highest short program or rhythm dance
Discipline	Gold	Silver	Bronze
Men	(Georgia (country)); Nika Egadze	(Estonia); Aleksandr Selevko	(Estonia); Mihhail Selevko
Women	(Estonia); Niina Petrõkina	(Belgium); Nina Pinzarrone	(Italy); Anna Pezzetta
Pairs	(Georgia (country)); Anastasiia Metelkina; Luka Berulava	(Germany); Minerva Fabienne Hase; Nikita Volodin	(Hungary); Maria Pavlova; Alexei Sviatchenko
Ice dance	(France); Laurence Fournier Beaudry; Guillaume Cizeron	(United Kingdom); Lilah Fear; Lewis Gibson	(Italy); Charlène Guignard; Marco Fabbri

Small medals awarded to the skaters who achieved the highest free skating or free dance placements in each discipline:

Small medal recipients for highest free skate or free dance
Discipline	Gold	Silver	Bronze
Men	(Georgia (country)); Nika Egadze	(Italy); Matteo Rizzo	(Czech Republic); Georgii Reshtenko
Women	(Estonia); Niina Petrõkina	(Georgia (country)); Anastasiia Gubanova	(Belgium); Loena Hendrickx
Pairs	(Georgia (country)); Anastasiia Metelkina; Luka Berulava	(Hungary); Maria Pavlova; Alexei Sviatchenko	(Germany); Minerva Fabienne Hase; Nikita Volodin
Ice dance	(France); Laurence Fournier Beaudry; Guillaume Cizeron	(Italy); Charlène Guignard; Marco Fabbri	(United Kingdom); Lilah Fear; Lewis Gibson

=== Medals by country ===
Table of medals for overall placement:

Rank	Nation	Gold	Silver	Bronze	Total
1	Georgia	2	0	0	2
2	Estonia	1	0	0	1
2	France	1	0	0	1
4	Italy	0	2	1	3
5	Belgium	0	1	0	1
5	Germany	0	1	0	1
7	Czech Republic	0	0	1	1
7	Great Britain	0	0	1	1
7	Hungary	0	0	1	1
Totals (9 entries)		4	4	4	12

== Results ==
=== Men's singles ===
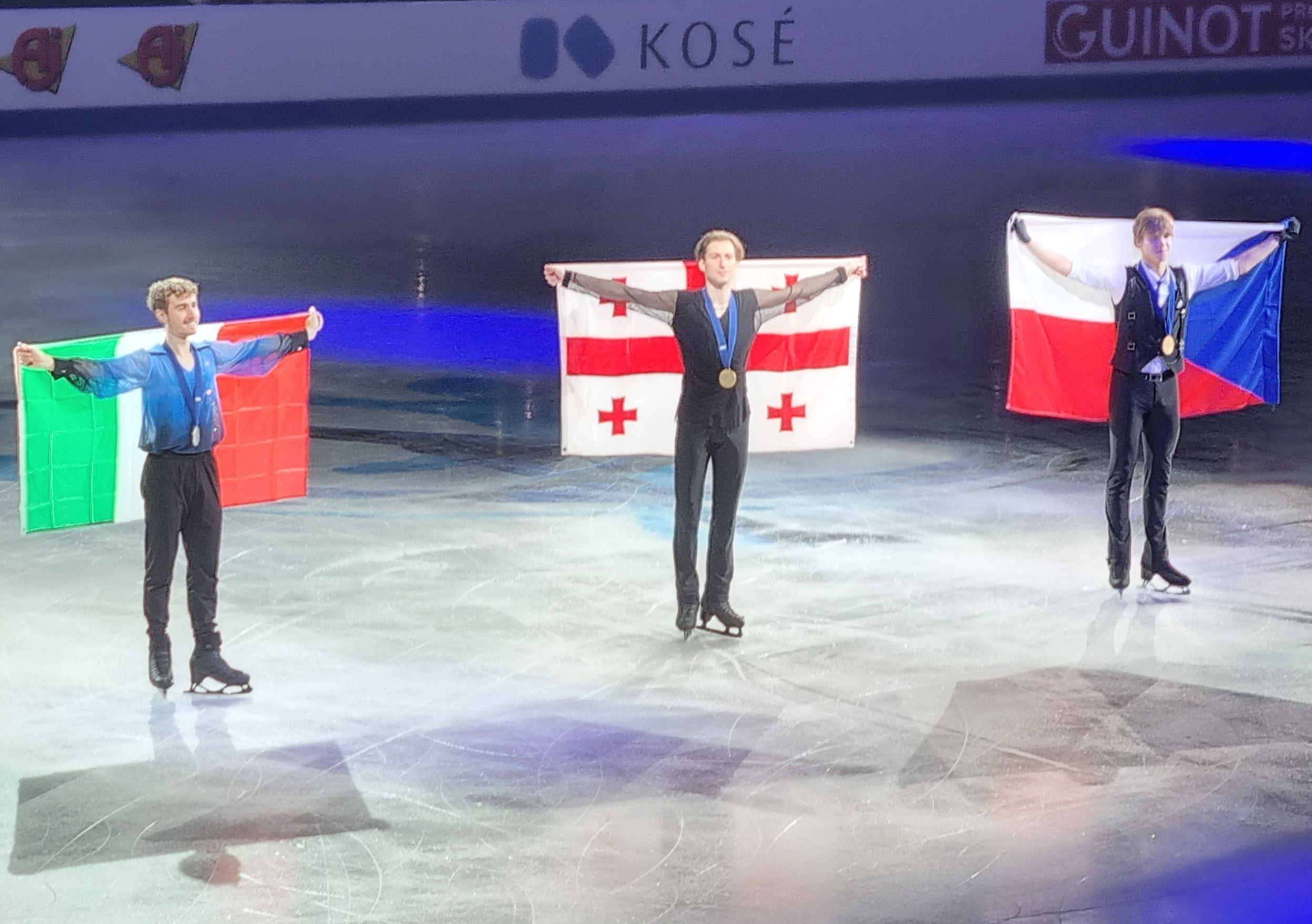
Men's medallists

Nika Egadze of Georgia won the gold medal after winning both the short program and free skate segments, making history as the first men's singles skater from his country to achieve this result. "I am so happy to be here in the UK and to skate here," said the 23-year-old. "I feel so pleased. I was trying to compete with myself. I didn’t hear anyone’s scores. I just wanted to do my job here. And I think it wasn’t perfect, because in the second half of the program, I missed some element of the combo. Some things I need to correct a little bit. But I’m so happy that I finally made it. I am not feeling yet that I am the champion. I am just glad that I did two almost clean programs. There were small things but overall, I am thrilled."

Matteo Rizzo of Italy won the silver medal following two solid performances. "Obviously I’m happy about everything," said the 27-year-old. "Of course, you always want more, and I know I haven’t skated my best today. Also, Nika today—he really pulled out an incredible program, a really big program! So, kudos to him. I’m still very happy about the result. I’m happy for my team and for everybody else." Rizzo went into the event, competing with Nikolaj Memola, for the second men's Olympic spot for Team Italy. The spot was to be determined by the Italian Ice Sports Federation depending on which skater had the higher placement. Following Rizzo's result, he was ultimately awarded that Olympic spot. "I grew up in Milan," Rizzo shared, "And I know it’s going to be special... I think I skated my best, and I think I showed everybody what I can do and what I am worth."

Georgii Reshtenko of the Czech Republic finished the event as the surprise bronze medalist. He placed eighth in the short program due to low levels on his spins and footwork sequence. "I was hoping for a score like maybe 80, 81," he shared. "But then I looked at the protocols, and I looked at my spins and I was, I am so dumb. So I really don’t want to lose points on the spins, so I will pay attention to that in the free program." Reshtenko went on to deliver a strong free skate performance, placing third in that segment with a new personal best score and moving up the bronze medal position overall. "Today, something happened that I didn’t expect for sure!" he said. "I am super happy in how I did and I was just surprised. I wasn’t expecting to sit in that leader’s chair and be in the lead at all because our group was so strong, as you saw. And everyone was going clean and I didn’t expect that at all... I barely made the free skate at Europeans last year. I was 23rd, and I am now, you know, third. I am so happy about it."

Brothers Aleksandr and Mihhail Selevko of Estonia went into the event competing for the sole Estonian men's Olympic spot. They placed second and third in the short program, respectively. "It was always our dream to be on the European podium together. Right now it feels like we achieved this dream. No one can take this away from us," they shared. During the free skate, however, they both struggled with Aleksandr placing tenth in the free skate and Mihhail placing eleventh. They ultimately dropped to fifth and sixth place, respectively. "Well, it wasn’t my best performance for sure," stated Aleksandr following his free skate. "It was really tiring. I was trying to invest to save points wherever it was possible." Mihhail speaking on his own experience shared, "It was definitely a fight through the program. I was trying to take it one jump at a time, but yeah, I’m a bit disappointed. The practice sessions were going really well, and I was hoping to show that, but it happens."

Kévin Aymoz of France, a gold medal contender, had a disastrous short program and did not advance to the free skate segment.

Men's results
Rank	Skater	Nation	Total	SP		FS	
1st place, gold medalist(s)	Nika Egadze	Georgia	273.00	1	91.28	1	181.72
2nd place, silver medalist(s)	Matteo Rizzo	Italy	256.37	4	88.00	2	168.37
3rd place, bronze medalist(s)	Georgii Reshtenko	Czech Republic	238.27	8	78.62	3	159.65
4	Lukas Britschgi	Switzerland	236.90	6	82.12	5	154.78
5	Aleksandr Selevko	Estonia	232.46	2	88.71	10	143.75
6	Mihhail Selevko	Estonia	230.30	3	88.28	11	142.02
7	Tamir Kuperman	Israel	230.17	7	79.82	7	150.35
8	Kyrylo Marsak	Ukraine	229.25	11	76.92	6	152.33
9	Deniss Vasiļjevs	Latvia	227.51	9	77.80	8	149.71
10	Adam Hagara	Slovakia	224.27	14	68.96	4	155.31
11	Nikolaj Memola	Italy	223.52	10	77.77	9	145.75
12	Andreas Nordebäck	Sweden	216.08	12	76.78	12	139.30
13	Daniel Grassl	Italy	215.33	5	84.82	15	130.51
14	Jari Kessler	Croatia	201.46	20	66.32	13	135.14
15	Fedir Kulish	Latvia	201.22	16	68.52	14	132.70
16	François Pitot	France	197.87	13	73.09	21	124.78
17	Maurizio Zandron	Austria	196.25	19	67.68	17	128.57
18	Tomàs-Llorenç Guarino Sabaté	Spain	195.42	17	67.94	19	127.48
19	Vladimir Samoilov	Poland	193.49	23	64.55	16	128.94
20	Davide Lewton Brain	Monaco	192.87	21	65.28	18	127.59
21	Ean Weiler	Switzerland	190.63	15	68.92	22	121.71
22	Genrikh Gartung	Germany	189.32	24	64.45	20	124.87
23	Matias Lindfors	Finland	183.63	18	67.80	24	115.83
24	Edward Appleby	Great Britain	181.72	22	64.95	23	116.77
25	Jakub Lofek	Poland	59.76	25	59.76	Did not advance to free skate	
26	Alp Eren Özkan	Turkey	58.47	26	58.47	Did not advance to free skate	
27	Kévin Aymoz	France	53.95	27	53.95	Did not advance to free skate	
28	Alexander Zlatkov	Bulgaria	50.90	28	50.90	Did not advance to free skate	
29	David Sedej	Slovenia	46.18	29	46.18	Did not advance to free skate	

=== Women's singles ===
Niina Petrõkina of Estonia successfully defended her European title from the previous year and scored personal bests in all three competition segments. She had only recently begun training her Lutz and flip jumps around two weeks prior to the event following a surgery she had performed on her Achilles in early October. "...The whole preparation for this event was done in a week," shared Petrõkina. "I’m so grateful to my team, my coaches, my doctors for all the work that we did. I came in here with expectation to skate clean, because I knew I could do it, but I’m still in shock a little bit, because everything happened so fast... Tonight, the crowd was so loud that I thought I was in Estonia! At my first European victory, I was shocked. This time I came here to win. I wanted to show everyone that it was possible to win twice, because back in Estonia, I was told that it is really almost impossible to win it twice, so I wanted to prove that it is possible."

Loena Hendrickx of Belgium won the silver medal. Having undergone ankle surgery in February 2025, this event was only her third competition of the season. Despite feeling ill on the morning of the short program, Hendrickx still opted to compete, placing fifth in that segment following fall on her opening triple Flip and underrotating the back end of triple Lutz-triple toe while the first jump was deemed to be a quarter rotation short. "I’m disappointed because I worked really hard and this mistake on the flip usually never happens in training," shared Hendrickx. "I think it was the adrenaline which made the difference to the practice, but yeah, after the mistake, I still tried to enjoy my performance and skate for the crowd. I am happy with the Lutz. I went for the triple-triple and showed that I am a fighter." She delivered a more solid free skate though lost points from not attempting a triple-triple combination, placing third in that segment of the competition and moving up to the silver medal position overall. Hendrickx stated that she was not satisfied with her performance and said she’d rather have had second place with a "better program."

Lara Naki Gutmann of Italy took the bronze medal after placing fourth in both the short program and free skate segments, becoming the first Italian women singles skater to make the podium at a European Championships since Carolina Kostner in 2018. Kostner, herself, attended the event and congratulated Gutmann following her podium placement. "I want to come back stronger at the next competition," said Gutmann. "I really wasn’t satisfied, but I was fighting until the end, and I think this is what brought me this medal. Of course, it’s a huge honor for me to be the first Italian to win a medal at the Europeans after Carolina Kostner." Her Jaws free skate received positive reception from the audience and many skating fans threw shark stuffed animals onto the ice for her following that performance. "The public today was so loud and threw a lot of sharks!" noted the 23-year-old. "I am so grateful for that because I love that so much. Actually, I have so many sharks at my home and I will take all of them that I got here home because I love them. What I will do with them at the end of the season, I don’t know really yet."

Nina Pinzarrone of Belgium, the two-time and reigning European bronze medalist, came into the event after missing the entire first half of the season due to a foot injury that required surgery. She placed second in the short program, earning a season's best score. "This is my first big competition after 10 months, and right now, I’m feeling hungry to go out there for the long," shared Pinzarrone. "It was kind of a good feeling to close the night. I was a bit too nervous for my liking. The score is good, and it feels good to be second going into the free skate. A small medal is already something." She struggled throughout the free skate, however, taking a fall on a planned triple loop and having several jumps called as underrotated. Pinzarrone placed eighth in that segment and dropped to fourth place overall. "I’m a bit sad, of course," said the 19-year-old following her performance. "I think I have to sleep over it, but after winning the small medal, you automatically think about the big one. But the small medal is already something and it will look good in my collection."

Anastasiia Gubanova of Georgia, the reigning European silver medalist, had a disappointing short program, only placing eleventh in that segment. "Shit happens. That’s what it is today,” she said matter-of-factly. "Of course, I will fight in the free program. My preparation wasn’t ideal. The first half of the season was very tough, many competitions. It was quite stressful. Now there was a lot of time in between. My shape isn’t the best, but I will try to get into my very best shape for the competition that matters the most, the Olympic Games." Gubanova rallied back with a strong free skate, placing second in that segment and finishing fifth overall. "Today, for me, it was not easy emotionally to put myself together,” admitted the 23-year-old. “To be honest, practices did not go well between the short and the free, and also the warm-up wasn’t perfect, but I didn’t give up."

Women's results
Rank	Skater	Nation	Total	SP		FS	
1st place, gold medalist(s)	Niina Petrõkina	Estonia	216.14	1	70.61	1	145.53
2nd place, silver medalist(s)	Loena Hendrickx	Belgium	191.26	5	63.34	3	127.92
3rd place, bronze medalist(s)	Lara Naki Gutmann	Italy	186.87	4	63.75	4	123.12
4	Nina Pinzarrone	Belgium	185.40	2	64.97	8	120.43
5	Anastasiia Gubanova	Georgia	184.36	11	56.17	2	128.19
6	Sarina Joos	Italy	180.84	7	58.90	5	121.94
7	Kimmy Repond	Switzerland	177.89	6	59.28	9	118.61
8	Anna Pezzetta	Italy	177.14	3	64.85	13	112.29
9	Ekaterina Kurakova	Poland	175.15	8	58.08	10	117.07
10	Iida Karhunen	Finland	174.49	16	53.73	7	120.76
11	Julia Sauter	Romania	174.37	18	52.53	6	121.84
12	Stefania Yakovleva	Cyprus	173.17	12	56.16	11	117.01
13	Olga Mikutina	Austria	166.55	15	53.90	12	112.65
14	Mia Risa Gomez	Norway	158.29	17	53.07	15	105.22
15	Léa Serna	France	157.09	14	55.72	16	101.37
16	Josefin Taljegård	Sweden	156.99	23	50.44	14	106.55
17	Livia Kaiser	Switzerland	154.04	9	57.02	19	97.02
18	Lorine Schild	France	153.29	13	56.14	18	97.15
19	Nataly Langerbaur	Estonia	151.61	10	56.21	21	95.40
20	Vanesa Šelmeková	Slovakia	151.31	19	52.50	17	98.81
21	Mariia Seniuk	Israel	148.51	20	52.40	20	96.11
22	Julija Lovrenčič	Slovenia	140.70	21	51.71	22	88.99
23	Kristen Spours	Great Britain	137.14	22	50.70	23	86.44
24	Jogailė Aglinskytė	Lithuania	114.01	24	50.30	24	63.71
25	Alexandra Feigin	Bulgaria	49.70	25	49.70	Did not advance to free skate	
26	Kristina Lisovskaja	Estonia	49.62	26	49.62	Did not advance to free skate	
27	Antonina Dubinina	Serbia	49.56	27	49.56	Did not advance to free skate	
28	Niki Wories	Netherlands	48.14	28	48.14	Did not advance to free skate	
29	Ariadna Gupta Espada	Spain	46.76	29	46.76	Did not advance to free skate	
30	Nargiz Süleymanova	Azerbaijan	46.60	30	46.60	Did not advance to free skate	
31	Nina Povey	Great Britain	46.11	31	46.11	Did not advance to free skate	
32	Katinka Anna Zsembery	Hungary	45.93	32	45.93	Did not advance to free skate	
33	Anastasia Gracheva	Moldova	45.59	33	45.59	Did not advance to free skate	
34	Barbora Vránková	Czech Republic	44.67	34	44.67	Did not advance to free skate	
35	Yelizaveta Babenko	Ukraine	43.76	35	43.76	Did not advance to free skate	
36	Lucrezia Gennaro	Greece	43.20	36	43.20	Did not advance to free skate	
37	Nikola Fomchenkova	Latvia	42.76	37	42.76	Did not advance to free skate	
38	Laura Szczęsna	Poland	40.51	38	40.51	Did not advance to free skate	

=== Pairs ===
Anastasiia Metelkina and Luka Berulava of Georgia won the gold medal, becoming the first Georgian pair team to achieve this result. Winning both the short and free skate segments following two solid performances, Metelkina shared, "We are crazy happy to have won the European Championships! We’ve had the bronze, the silver, and now we finally got the gold medal. We couldn’t be happier right now!" Regarding the upcoming Olympic Games, Berulava said, "Right now, the situation is very interesting. It’s fascinating because there’s not a clear leader. There are six top teams and all together, and everyone is aiming for the gold medal. Each of us, each athlete, we all have the same goal. I think all the teams are ready and very well prepared and it’s going to be a very exciting competition!"

Defending European Champions, Minerva Fabienne Hase and Nikita Volodin of Germany settled for the silver medal. They placed second in the short program due to Hase putting a hand down on the pair's attempted side-by-side triple Salchow. "I would say today we were a bit shaky, shaky legs," said Hase following the performance. "Because of that, I’m pretty pleased with how we skated this program until the end. We kept it together very well and didn’t lose too much. Today was an improvement from the Grand Prix Final, so it’s a step up. We don’t really think about being defending champions here. That’s not really in our head. But every competition has different conditions. For example, the backstage here is very cold. There’s just some small little things that influence how you feel on the ice." During the free skate, Hase and Volodin made several costly mistakes, including Volodin losing his footing during the final pair lift which cause Hase to fall during the exit. They placed third in that segment and retained the silver medal position overall. "After the performance, the support was amazing!" said Hase after the event. "How loud they still got! Even though we didn’t skate our best, we appreciated that a lot. It also made everything a little bit better, a little bit less heavy, because we could still enjoy the moment because the people enjoyed it a little bit with us. So, I was happy for the people, for the crowd, and this gives us a lot of motivation... We are not quite happy about our skate, and I think everyone knows that. We are happy that we fought until the end and we pushed until the end. It was not the performance we hoped for, but we could still save the silver medal, which is a nice thing. We can still be happy about. I think now we got a lot of motivation and energy to go back to practice. And in three weeks, everything will hopefully come into place, and we can hopefully show our full potential."

Maria Pavlova and Alexei Sviatchenko of Hungary won the bronze medal, becoming the first Hungarian pair team to medal since Marianna Nagy and László Nagy in 1957 and the first skaters from Hungary to medal since Júlia Sebestyén in 2004. The pair placed third in the short program, earning a new personal best score. "It feels amazing!" said Pavlova of their performance. "This season, we are confident in ourselves and trust the process. It felt amazing throughout the whole program." They went on to place second in the free skate and retained their bronze medal position overall. "The skate today was tough. It was very tough, but we pulled it through with some mistakes," Pavlova shared following their free skate. "But overall, we’re happy, and we know where to go from here and what we have to work for... It’s been a long time since Pairs’ for Hungary earned a medal. So, I think it’s a big achievement for us and for the country. It’s an amazing feeling."

Pairs' results
Rank	Team	Nation	Total	SP		FS	
1st place, gold medalist(s)	Anastasiia Metelkina; Luka Berulava	Georgia	215.76	1	75.96	1	139.80
2nd place, silver medalist(s)	Minerva Fabienne Hase; Nikita Volodin	Germany	203.87	2	74.81	3	129.06
3rd place, bronze medalist(s)	Maria Pavlova; Alexei Sviatchenko	Hungary	202.56	3	73.32	2	129.24
4	Annika Hocke; Robert Kunkel	Germany	188.27	4	65.47	4	122.80
5	Oxana Vouillamoz; Tom Bouvart	Switzerland	183.31	6	62.78	5	120.53
6	Rebecca Ghilardi; Filippo Ambrosini	Italy	174.31	7	59.40	6	114.91
7	Anastasia Vaipan-Law; Luke Digby	Great Britain	173.52	5	63.98	9	109.54
8	Ioulia Chtchetinina; Michał Woźniak	Poland	168.84	10	56.93	8	111.91
9	Anna Valesi; Martin Bidař	Czech Republic	167.42	12	53.80	7	113.62
10	Camille Kovalev; Pavel Kovalev	France	165.09	8	58.25	10	106.84
11	Júlía Sylvía Gunnarsdóttir; Manuel Piazza	Iceland	162.62	9	57.45	11	105.17
12	Gabriella Izzo; Luc Maierhofer	Austria	158.08	11	54.65	12	103.43
13	Irma Caldara; Riccardo Maglio	Italy	153.62	14	53.29	14	100.33
14	Aurélie Faula; Théo Belle	France	152.85	13	53.66	15	99.19
15	Daria Danilova; Michel Tsiba	Netherlands	149.33	15	46.57	13	102.76
16	Sofiia Holichenko; Artem Darenskyi	Ukraine	126.78	16	42.32	16	84.46

=== Ice dance ===
Ice dance results
Rank	Team	Nation	Total	RD		FD	
1st place, gold medalist(s)	Laurence Fournier Beaudry; Guillaume Cizeron	France	222.43	1	86.93	1	135.50
2nd place, silver medalist(s)	Charlène Guignard; Marco Fabbri	Italy	210.34	3	84.48	2	125.86
3rd place, bronze medalist(s)	Lilah Fear; Lewis Gibson	Great Britain	209.51	2	85.47	3	124.04
4	Evgeniia Lopareva; Geoffrey Brissaud	France	204.72	5	82.38	4	122.34
5	Allison Reed; Saulius Ambrulevičius	Lithuania	200.29	4	83.08	7	117.21
6	Diana Davis; Gleb Smolkin	Georgia	199.31	6	78.67	6	120.64
7	Olivia Smart; Tim Dieck	Spain	196.44	10	75.17	5	121.27
8	Juulia Turkkila; Matthias Versluis	Finland	193.83	7	78.59	8	115.24
9	Loïcia Demougeot; Théo le Mercier	France	191.62	8	77.88	9	113.74
10	Natálie Taschlerová; Filip Taschler	Czech Republic	189.47	9	77.33	10	112.14
11	Phebe Bekker; James Hernandez	Great Britain	178.39	11	71.64	13	106.75
12	Yuka Orihara; Juho Pirinen	Finland	175.76	16	64.99	11	110.77
13	Milla Ruud Reitan; Nikolaj Majorov	Sweden	175.74	12	68.89	12	106.75
14	Sofía Val; Asaf Kazimov	Spain	173.73	15	67.11	14	106.62
15	Mariia Ignateva; Danijil Szemko	Hungary	171.63	14	67.74	15	103.89
16	Victoria Manni; Carlo Röthlisberger	Italy	170.05	13	67.84	17	102.21
17	Charise Matthaei; Max Liebers	Germany	166.31	17	63.49	16	102.82
18	Shira Ichilov; Mikhail Nosovitskiy	Israel	158.33	19	61.20	18	97.13
19	Carolane Soucisse; Shane Firus	Ireland	150.99	18	62.71	19	88.28
20	Zoe Larson; Andrii Kapran	Ukraine	142.84	20	59.24	20	83.60
21	Gina Zehnder; Beda Leon Sieber	Switzerland	59.12	21	59.12	Did not advance to free dance	
22	Angelina Kudryavtseva; Ilia Karankevich	Cyprus	58.10	22	58.10	Did not advance to free dance	
23	Chelsea Verhaegh; Sherim van Geffen	Netherlands	55.42	23	55.42	Did not advance to free dance	
24	Anita Straub; Andreas Straub	Austria	54.07	24	54.07	Did not advance to free dance	
25	Sofiia Dovhal; Wiktor Kulesza	Poland	53.34	25	53.34	Did not advance to free dance	
26	Samantha Ritter; Daniel Brykalov	Azerbaijan	51.29	26	51.29	Did not advance to free dance	
27	Daniela Ivanitskiy; Matthew Sperry	Finland	50.16	27	50.16	Did not advance to free dance	
28	Olivia Shilling; Leo Baeten	Belgium	49.54	28	49.54	Did not advance to free dance	

== Works cited ==
- "Special Regulations & Technical Rules – Single & Pair Skating and Ice Dance 2024" (PDF). International Skating Union. Archived (PDF) from the original on 3 June 2025.
