= Nika Egadze =

Georgian figure skater (born 2002)

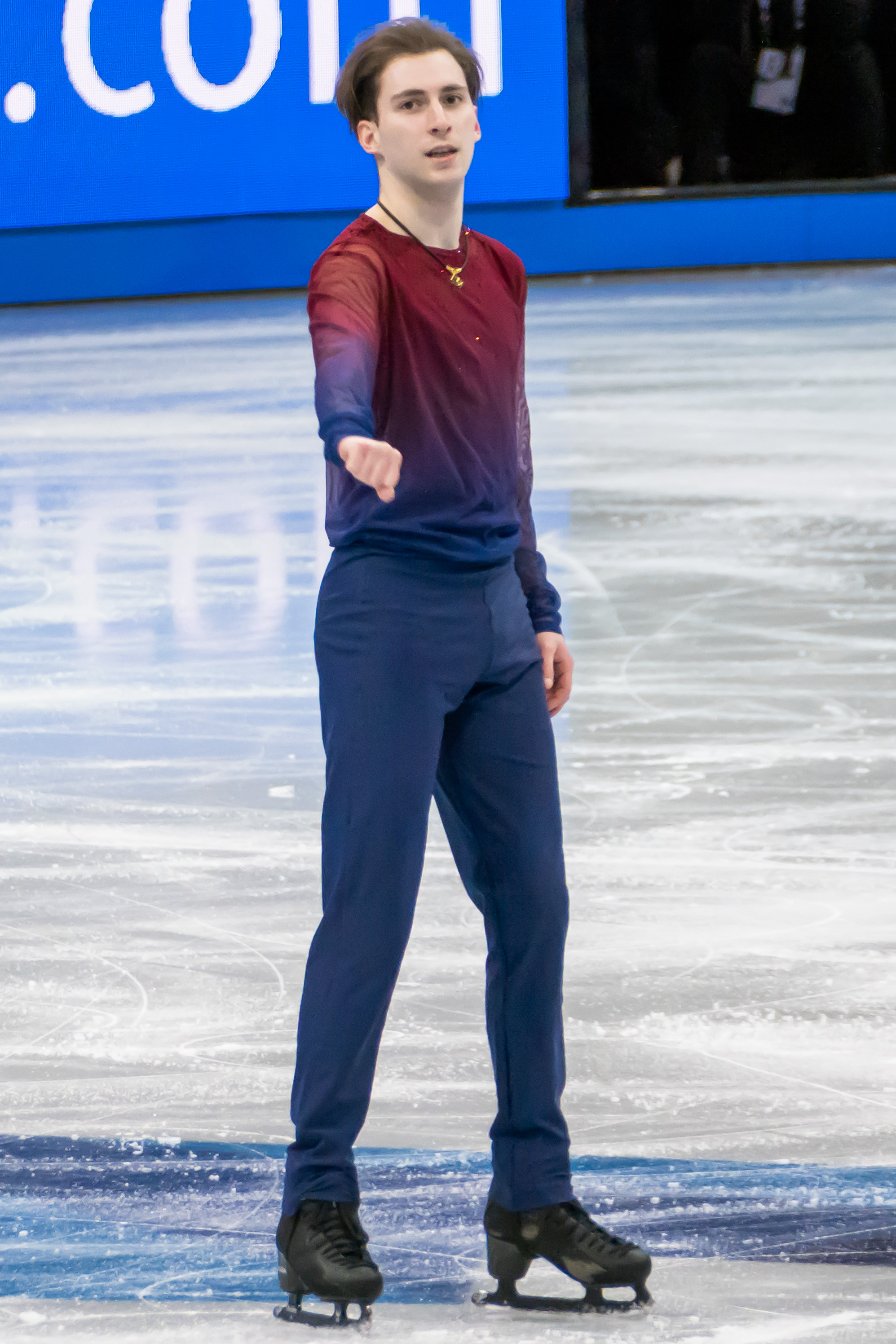
- Egadze at the 2025 World Championships

Personal information
- Native name: ნიკა ეგაძე (Georgian)
- Born: 2 April 2002 (age 24) Tbilisi, Georgia
- Height: 1.81 m (5 ft 11 in)

Figure skating career
- Country: Georgia
- Discipline: Men's singles
- Coach: Eteri Tutberidze; Benoit Richaud; Sergei Dudakov; Daniil Gleikhengauz
- Skating club: Batumi Sports Centre
- Began skating: 2011

Medal record
European Championships
Gold medal – first place	2026 Sheffield	Singles
Georgian Championships
Gold medal – first place	2024 Tbilisi	Singles

Nika Egadze (Georgian: ნიკა ეგაძე; born 2 April 2002) is a Georgian figure skater. He is the 2026 European champion, the 2025 Grand Prix de France bronze medalist and a nine-time ISU Challenger Series medalist. On the junior level, he is the 2017 European Youth Olympic bronze medalist and competed in the final segment at the 2020 World Junior Championships.

== Personal life ==
Egadze was born on April 2, 2002 in Tbilisi, Georgia. His father makes jewelry, while his mother is a mathematician. In addition, he has a younger brother.

His godfather is a fellow Georgian pair skater Luka Berulava.

== Career ==
=== Early years ===
Egadze began learning how to skate in 2011 at the age of nine; his first figure skating coach was Marina Jaiani.

=== 2016–17 season ===
Egadze, coached by Lea Chopikashvili in Batumi, made his junior grand prix debut on the 2016–17 ISU Junior Grand Prix circuit, finishing fourteenth at 2016 JGP France. He subsequently won the bronze medal on the junior level at the 2016 Ice Star and silver on the junior level at the 2016 Santa Claus Cup.

Following the season, Egadze moved to Moscow, Russia to train under Eteri Tutberidze and Sergei Dudakov.

=== 2017–18 season ===
Egadze started the season by competing on the 2017–18 ISU Junior Grand Prix circuit, finishing thirteenth at 2017 JGP Austria and at 2017 JGP Croatia. Although, he went on to compete on the junior level at the 2017 Golden Spin of Zagreb but withdrew following the short program.

=== 2019–20 season ===
Egadze began the season in January, winning gold on the junior level at the 2019 Skate Helena. He was then selected to compete at the 2019 World Junior Championships in Zagreb, Croatia, finishing in eighteenth place overall.

=== 2021–22 season: Senior debut ===
Making his senior international debut, Egadze started the season by finishing fourth at the 2021 CS Denis Ten Memorial Challenge. He followed this up by winning bronze at the 2021 Volvo Open Cup and gold at the 2021 CS Cup of Austria.

He then placed eleventh at the 2021 Rostelecom Cup, before also placing eleventh at the 2021 CS Golden Spin of Zagreb.

Egadze finished the season by making his Senior Championship debut at the 2022 European Championships in Tallinn, Estonia. He placed twenty-eighth in the short program and did not advance in the free skate segment of the competition.

=== 2022–23 season ===
Egadze began the season by competing on the 2022–23 ISU Challenger Series, placing fifth at the 2022 CS Lombardia Trophy and winning gold at the 2022 CS Denis Ten Memorial Challenge. He followed up these results by finishing fifth at the 2022 Grand Prix de France and seventh at the 2022 NHK Trophy.

Going on to compete at the 2023 European Championships in Espoo, Finland, Egadze finished seventh overall after placing twelfth in the short program and seventh in the free skate. He then made his World Championship debut at the 2023 World Championships in Saitama, Japan. Egadze placed twenty-ninth in the short program and did not advance to the free skate segment of the competition.

=== 2023–24 season ===
Egadze started the season by competing on the 2023–24 ISU Challenger Series, winning silver at the 2023 CS Lombardia Trophy and at the 2023 CS Nepela Memorial. He then went on to finish fourth at 2023 Skate America. "I managed to perform my program quite well, but some of my jumps didn’t happen today," he said after the free skate. "Overall, I am happy." He went on to take silver at the 2023 CS Denis Ten Memorial Challenge, and fourth at the 2023 NHK Trophy.

In January, he competed at the 2024 European Championships in Kaunas, Lithuania, finishing in seventh place. “I am very disappointed by my performance this week, but I am happy I fought,” he said. Two months later, he placed thirteenth at the 2024 World Championships in Montreal, Quebec, Canada.

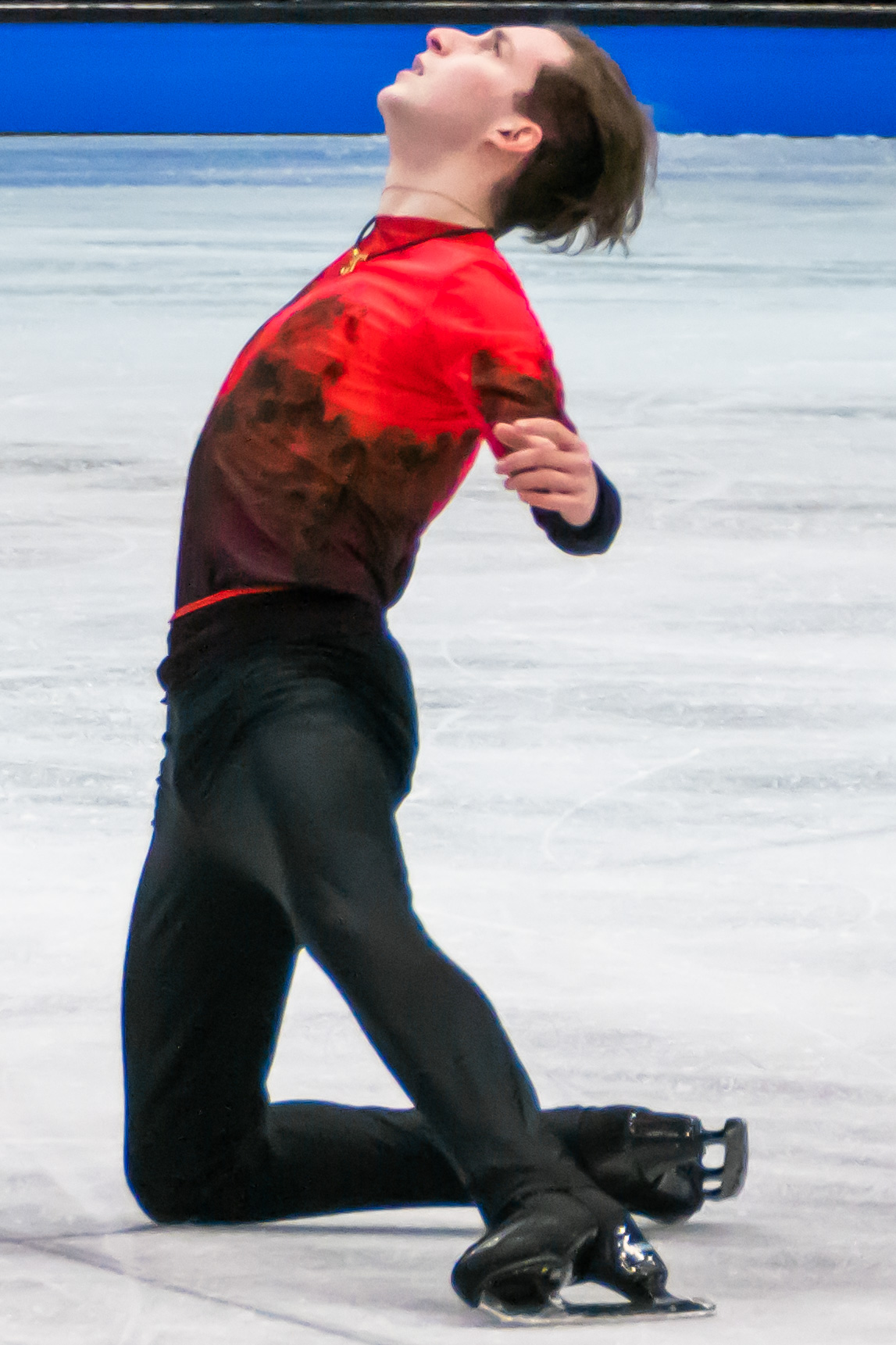
Egadze performing his free skate at the 2025 World Championships

=== 2024–25 season ===
Egadze began the season by competing on the 2024–25 ISU Challenger Series, finishing fifth at the 2024 CS Lombardia Trophy and winning the bronze medal at the 2024 CS Denis Ten Memorial Challenge.

He subsequently competed on the 2024–25 Grand Prix circuit, placing fourth at 2024 Skate America "It was a good energy here at this entire competition," he said after the free skate. "Very high level. Us last five skaters were at "The Ice" together in Japan, and it is really nice to be able to talk between each other. Especially, I liked competing here together with Ilia and being able to talk in the dressing room. It was a really good competition overall." He then went on to compete at the 2024 Cup of China, placing fourth.

Following a fourth-place finish at the 2024 CS Golden Spin of Zagreb, Egadze competed at the 2025 European Championships in Tallinn, Estonia. He placed second in the short program but eighth in the free skate, dropping to fourth place overall.

In March, Egadze finished ninth at the 2025 World Championships in Boston, Massachusetts, United States. "Overall, I’m very pleased," he summed after the free skate. "I came into this program today with anger from Europeans, and I was 100% determined to make sure something like that wouldn’t happen again." The following month, he competed for Team Georgia at the 2025 World Team Trophy. He finished ninth in the men's singles event and Team Georgia placed sixth overall.

=== 2025–26 season: Milano Cortina Olympics, European champion ===
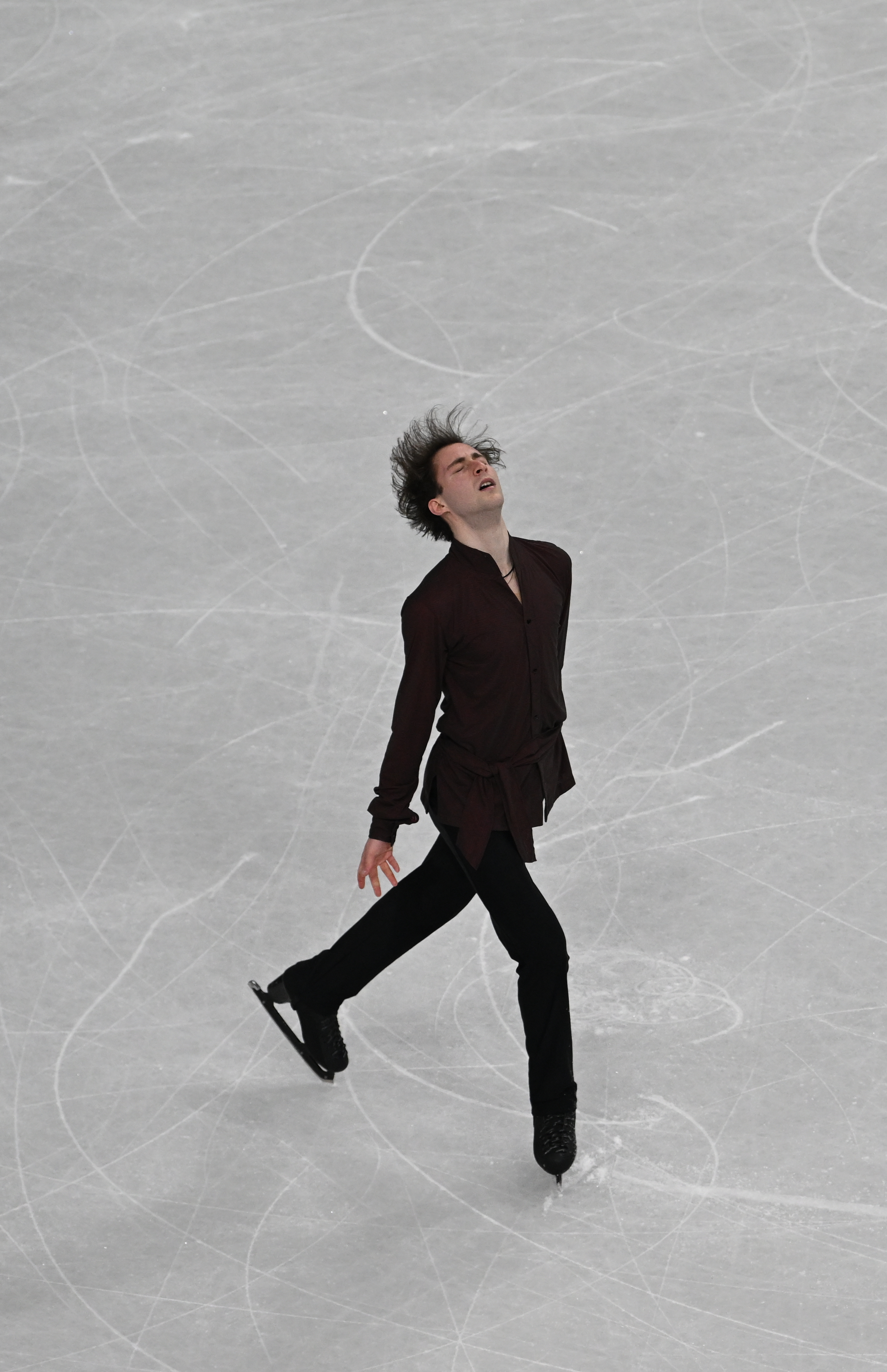
Egadze performing at the 2026 Winter Olympics

Egadze opened his season by competing on the 2025–26 ISU Challenger Series, winning silver at the 2025 CS Denis Ten Memorial Challenge and gold at the 2025 CS Trialeti Trophy.

He then competed on the 2025–26 Grand Prix series, winning the bronze medal at the 2025 Grand Prix de France. "I am so happy to have finally won the medal!" said Egadze. "Before that I had five Grand Prixes where I finished fourth, so I am really, really glad."

The following month, Egadze won the gold medal at the 2026 European Championships after placing first in both the short and free programs. In doing so, he became the first man from Georgia to win a gold at a European Championship. "I am so happy to be here in the UK and to skate here," said the 23-year-old. "I feel so pleased. I was trying to compete with myself. I didn’t hear anyone’s scores. I just wanted to do my job here."

On 7 February, Egadze placed sixth in the short program in the 2026 Winter Olympics Figure Skating Team Event. "It was not the skate I was working on, but it’s my first Olympics and my first time at the Olympic Games," he said. "I’m happy to be here. I’m very excited to be here, and I will try to skate better tomorrow." The following day, Egadze skated in the free skate segment of the team event, placing fifth in that segment. With his results, Team Georgia finished in fourth place overall. "I’m really sad about the team event," he later said, reflecting on his performances. "But it was an experience that will help me in my life — not only in sport, but also personally. I’ve realized that I need to think more about myself. Sometimes I think too much about others, and that makes things worse for me."

On 10 February, Egadze competed in the short program segment of the 2026 Winter Olympics – Men's singles event, placing fifteenth after making a mistake on his quad toe attempt. Two days later, he placed seventh in the free skate and moved up to tenth place overall. "I feel very good now because I ended my competition on a good note," he said following his free skate. "From the beginning of the competition, I kept getting better and better."

In March, Egadze completed his season at the 2026 World Championships. He placed fifteenth in the short program but rebounded to seventh in free skate, finishing eleventh overall.

== Programs ==
Season	Short program	Free skating	Exhibition
2026–2027	Lonesome Town by Rick Nelson; You Never Can Tell by Chuck Berry; Pump It (from "Pulp Fiction" soundtrack) by Black Eyed Peas choreo. by Benoît Richaud	Spider-Man 2 Main Title (soundtrack) by Danny Elfman; Look at Me; My Enemy (from "The Amazing Spider-Man 2" soundtrack) by Hans Zimmer; What’s up Danger (from "Spider Man") by Blackway & Black Caviar choreo. by Benoît Richaud	
2025–2026	Waltz by Mgzavrebi choreo. by Benoît Richaud	Sailing by Dirk Maassen; Verve by Ryan Taubert & Alexandra Petkovski; Sail by Awolnation choreo. by Benoît Richaud	L'enfer by Stromae choreo. by Daniil Gleikhengauz, Eteri Tutberidze; Deadpool & Wolverine; LFG by Rob Simonsen; The Lady in Red by Chris de Burgh; Bye Bye Bye by NSYNC
2024–2025	L'enfer by Stromae choreo. by Daniil Gleikhengauz, Eteri Tutberidze	The Winter by Balmorhea; Can You Hear the Music (from Oppenheimer) by Ludwig Göransson choreo. by Daniil Gleikhengauz, Eteri Tutberidze	Deadpool & Wolverine; LFG by Rob Simonsen; The Lady in Red by Chris de Burgh; Bye Bye Bye by NSYNC
2023–2024	Ave Maria by Vladimir Vavilov performed by Thomas Spencer-Wortley choreo. by Daniil Gleikhengauz	Moulin Rouge; Nature Boy performed by David Bowie; El Tango de Roxanne performed by Ewan McGregor choreo. by Daniil Gleikhengauz	Lacrimosa by Apashe
2022–2023	I Won't Complain by Benjamin Clementine choreo. by Daniil Gleikhengauz, Sergei Rozanov	SOS d'un terrien en détresse by Daniel Balavoine performed by Dimash Qudaibergen choreo. by Daniil Gleikhengauz	Sense by Tom Odell
2021–2022	I Won't Complain by Benjamin Clementine choreo. by Daniil Gleikhengauz, Sergei Rozanov	Un Giorno Per Noi (from Romeo and Juliet) by Henry Mancini performed by Josh Groban choreo. by Daniil Gleikhengauz, Sergei Rozanov	
2019–2020	La Sorcière; Tu vas me détruire (from Notre-Dame de Paris) by Riccardo Cocciante choreo. by Daniil Gleikhengauz, Sergei Rozanov	Opening Theme; Not in Blood, But in Bond; I Never Woke Up in Handcuffs Before; Discombobulate (from Sherlock Holmes) by Hans Zimmer choreo. by Daniil Gleikhengauz	
2017–2018	Rhapsody on a Theme of Paganini by Sergei Rachmaninoff choreo. by Daniil Gleikhengauz	Opening Theme; Not in Blood, But in Bond; I Never Woke Up in Handcuffs Before; Discombobulate (from Sherlock Holmes) by Hans Zimmer choreo. by Daniil Gleikhengauz	
2016–2017	The Mission by Ennio Morricone choreo. by Sandro Meshki	Nessun dorma (from Turandot) by Giacomo Puccini choreo. by Vakhtang Murvanidze	

== Competitive highlights ==
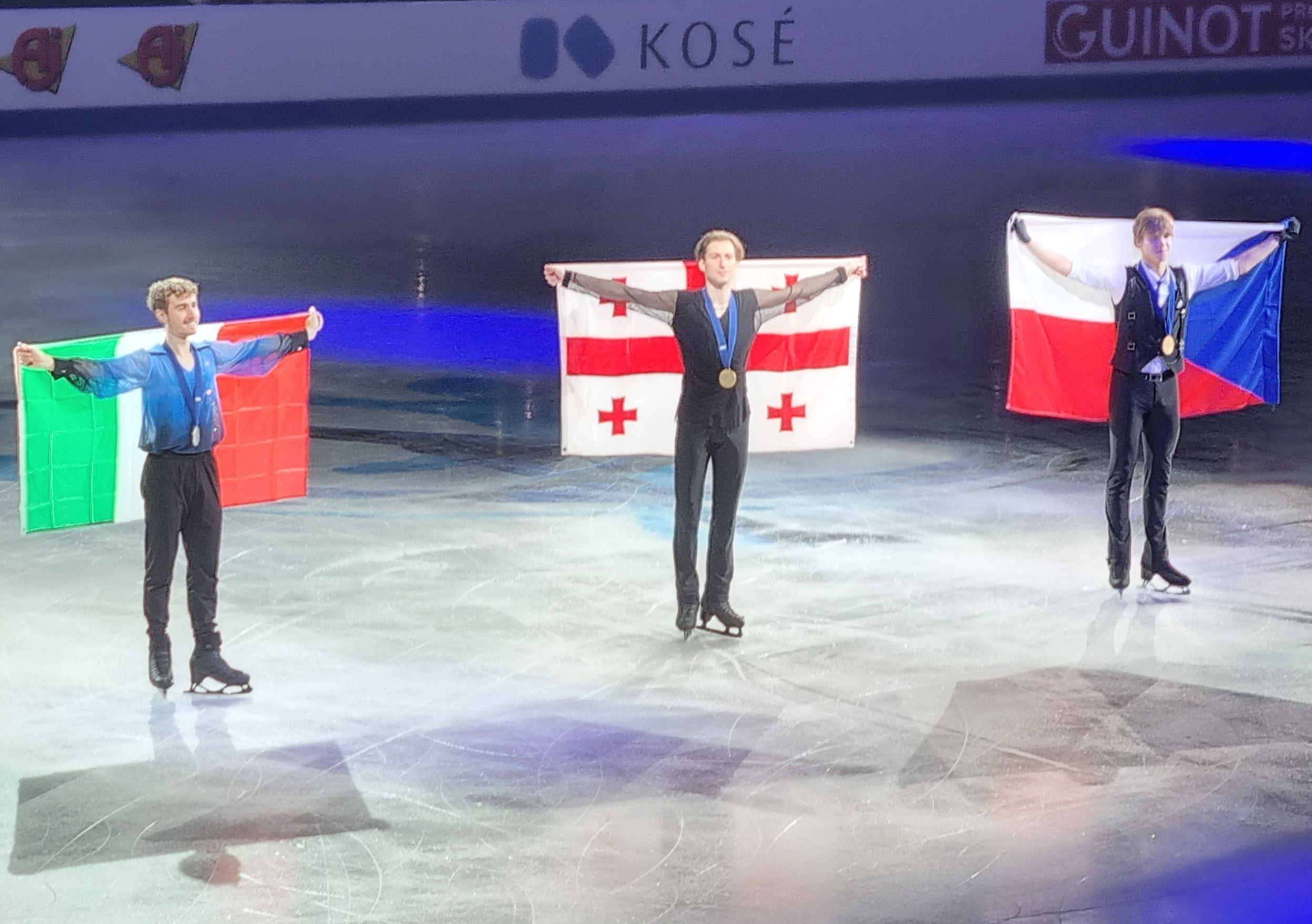
Egadze (middle) at the 2026 European Championships medal ceremony alongside Matteo Rizzo (left) and Georgii Reshtenko (right)

- GP – Event of the ISU Grand Prix Series
- JGP – Event of the ISU Junior Grand Prix Series
- CS – Event of the ISU Challenger Series
- TBD – Assigned
- WD – Withdrew from competition
- Medals at team events are awarded for the team results only. Individual placements at team events are listed in parentheses.

Competition placements at senior level
Season	2021–22	2022–23	2023–24	2024–25	2025–26	2026-27
Winter Olympics					10th	
Winter Olympics (Team Event)					4th	
World Championships		29th	13th	9th	11th	
European Championships	28th	7th	7th	4th	1st	
Georgian Championships			1st			
World Team Trophy				6th (9th)		
GP Cup of China				4th		8th
GP Finland						TBD
GP France		5th			3rd	
GP NHK Trophy		7th	4th			
GP Rostelecom Cup	11th					
GP Skate America			4th	4th		
GP Skate Canada					5th	
CS Cup of Austria	1st					
CS Denis Ten Memorial	4th	1st	2nd	3rd	2nd	
CS Golden Spin of Zagreb	11th			4th		
CS Lombardia Trophy		5th	2nd	5th		
CS Nepela Memorial			2nd			
CS Trialeti Trophy					1st	1st
Volvo Open Cup	3rd					

Competition placements at junior level
Season	2015–16	2016–17	2017–18	2019–20
World Junior Championships				18th
JGP Austria			13th	
JGP Croatia			13th	
JGP Slovenia		14th		
European Youth Olympic Festival		3rd		
Golden Spin of Zagreb			WD	
Ice Star		3rd		
Santa Claus Cup		2nd		
Skate Helena				1st
World Development Trophy	5th			

== Detailed results ==
ISU personal best scores in the +5/-5 GOE System
Segment	Type	Score	Event
Total	TSS	273.00	2026 European Championships
Short program	TSS	95.67	2025 Grand Prix de France
Short program	TES	54.53	2025 Grand Prix de France
Short program	PCS	41.50	2026 CS Trialeti Trophy
Free skating	TSS	181.72	2026 European Championships
Free skating	TES	100.86	2026 European Championships
Free skating	PCS	83.26	2026 CS Trialeti Trophy

=== Senior level ===
Results in the 2021–22 season
Date	Event	SP		FS		Total	
Date	Event	P	Score	P	Score	P	Score
Oct 28–31, 2021	(Kazakhstan) 2021 CS Denis Ten Memorial Challenge	6	69.65	4	154.00	4	223.65
Nov 6–7, 2021	(Latvia) 2021 Volvo Open Cup	3	76.52	2	149.08	3	225.60
Nov 11–14, 2021	2021 CS Cup of Austria	12	68.02	1	159.55	1	227.57
Nov 26–28, 2021	(Russia) 2021 Rostelecom Cup	12	50.35	7	159.82	11	210.17
Dec 7–11, 2021	(Croatia) 2021 CS Golden Spin of Zagreb	8	73.56	10	141.08	11	214.64
Jan 10–16, 2022	(Estonia) 2022 European Championships	28	63.60	—N/a	—N/a	28	63.60

Results in the 2022–23 season
Date	Event	SP		FS		Total	
Date	Event	P	Score	P	Score	P	Score
Sep 16–19, 2022	(Italy) 2022 CS Lombardia Trophy	3	82.82	5	134.82	5	217.64
Oct 26–29, 2022	(Kazakhstan) 2022 CS Denis Ten Memorial Challenge	1	71.81	1	136.66	1	208.47
Nov 4–6, 2022	2022 Grand Prix de France	4	82.44	6	150.96	5	233.40
Nov 18–20, 2022	(Japan) 2022 NHK Trophy	5	84.47	8	148.39	7	232.86
Jan 25–29, 2023	(Finland) 2023 European Championships	12	72.96	7	147.69	7	220.65
Mar 22–26, 2023	(Japan) 2023 World Championships	29	65.17	—N/a	—N/a	29	65.17

Results in the 2023–24 season
Date	Event	SP		FS		Total	
Date	Event	P	Score	P	Score	P	Score
Sep 8–10, 2023	(Italy) 2023 CS Lombardia Trophy	3	78.75	2	164.60	2	243.35
Sep 28–30, 2023	(Slovakia) 2023 CS Nepela Memorial	1	84.11	2	159.20	2	243.31
Oct 20–22, 2023	(United States) 2023 Skate America	5	85.76	5	151.69	4	237.45
Nov 1–4, 2023	(Kazakhstan) 2023 CS Denis Ten Memorial Challenge	1	83.95	2	150.87	2	234.82
Nov 24–26, 2023	(Japan) 2023 NHK Trophy	7	81.30	4	156.04	4	237.34
Dec 22–23, 2023	(Georgia (country)) 2024 Georgian Championships	1	—N/a	1	—N/a	1	—N/a
Jan 8–14, 2024	(Lithuania) 2024 European Championships	10	77.00	6	156.16	7	233.16
Mar 18–24, 2024	(Canada) 2024 World Championships	7	92.08	15	149.47	13	241.55

Results in the 2024–25 season
Date	Event	SP		FS		Total	
Date	Event	P	Score	P	Score	P	Score
Sep 12–15, 2024	(Italy) 2024 CS Lombardia Trophy	4	76.45	6	155.56	5	232.01
Oct 3-5, 2024	(Kazakhstan) 2024 CS Denis Ten Memorial Challenge	2	90.06	4	152.37	3	242.43
Oct 18–20, 2024	(United States) 2024 Skate America	3	93.89	4	167.82	4	261.71
Nov 22–24, 2024	2024 Cup of China	4	87.73	4	159.81	4	247.54
Dec 4–7, 2024	(Croatia) 2024 CS Golden Spin of Zagreb	5	75.18	4	141.83	4	217.01
Jan 28 – Feb 2, 2025	(Estonia) 2025 European Championships	2	91.94	8	151.93	4	243.87
Mar 25-30, 2025	(United States) 2025 World Championships	6	90.39	8	172.64	9	263.03
Apr 17–20, 2025	(Japan) 2025 World Team Trophy	8	84.76	10	147.83	6 (9)	232.59

Results in the 2025–26 season
Date	Event	SP		FS		Total	
Date	Event	P	Score	P	Score	P	Score
Oct 1–4, 2025	(Kazakhstan) 2025 CS Denis Ten Memorial Challenge	2	87.68	2	179.32	2	266.90
Oct 8–11, 2025	(Georgia (country)) 2025 CS Trialeti Trophy	1	89.60	1	171.42	1	261.02
Oct 17–19, 2025	2025 Grand Prix de France	2	95.67	4	163.74	3	259.41
Oct 31 – Nov 2, 2025	2025 Skate Canada International	8	85.92	4	162.03	5	247.95
Jan 13–18, 2026	(United Kingdom) 2026 European Championships	1	91.28	1	181.72	1	273.00
Feb 6–8, 2026	(Italy) 2026 Winter Olympics – Team event	6	84.37	5	154.79	4	—N/a
Feb 10–13, 2026	(Italy) 2026 Winter Olympics	15	85.11	7	175.16	10	260.27
Mar 24–29, 2026	(Czech Republic) 2026 World Championships	15	78.84	7	169.78	11	248.62

Results in the 2026–27 season
Date	Event	SP		FS		Total	
Date	Event	P	Score	P	Score	P	Score
1–4 Oct, 2026	(Georgia (country)) 2026 CS Trialeti Trophy	1	93.80	1	168.85	1	262.65

=== Junior level ===
Results in the 2015–16 season
Date	Event	SP		FS		Total	
Date	Event	P	Score	P	Score	P	Score
Apr 11–12, 2016	(Poland) 2016 World Development Trophy	3	48.48	6	78.43	5	126.91

Results in the 2016–17 season
Date	Event	SP		FS		Total	
Date	Event	P	Score	P	Score	P	Score
Sep 21–24, 2016	2016 JGP Slovenia	13	52.82	15	96.47	14	149.29
Nov 18–20, 2016	(Belarus) 2016 Ice Star	3	53.83	3	103.87	3	157.70
Dec 6–11, 2016	(Hungary) 2016 Santa Claus Cup	4	52.95	2	110.92	2	163.87
Feb 13–15, 2017	(Turkey) 2017 European Youth Olympic Winter Festival	6	53.71	4	101.47	3	155.18

Results in the 2017–18 season
Date	Event	SP		FS		Total	
Date	Event	P	Score	P	Score	P	Score
Aug 30 – Sep 2, 2017	2017 JGP Austria	16	46.56	8	113.96	13	160.52
Sep 27–30, 2017	2017 JGP Croatia	16	44.08	10	109.09	13	153.17
Dec 6–9, 2017	(Croatia) 2017 Golden Spin of Zagreb	1	69.60	—N/a	—N/a	–	WD

Results in the 2019–20 season
Date	Event	SP		FS		Total	
Date	Event	P	Score	P	Score	P	Score
Jan 16–18, 2020	(Serbia) 2020 Skate Helena	2	62.69	1	127.27	1	189.96
Mar 2–8, 2020	(Estonia) 2020 World Junior Championships	22	58.22	17	122.44	18	180.66
