= Maximiliano Fernandez =

American pair skater (born 1995)

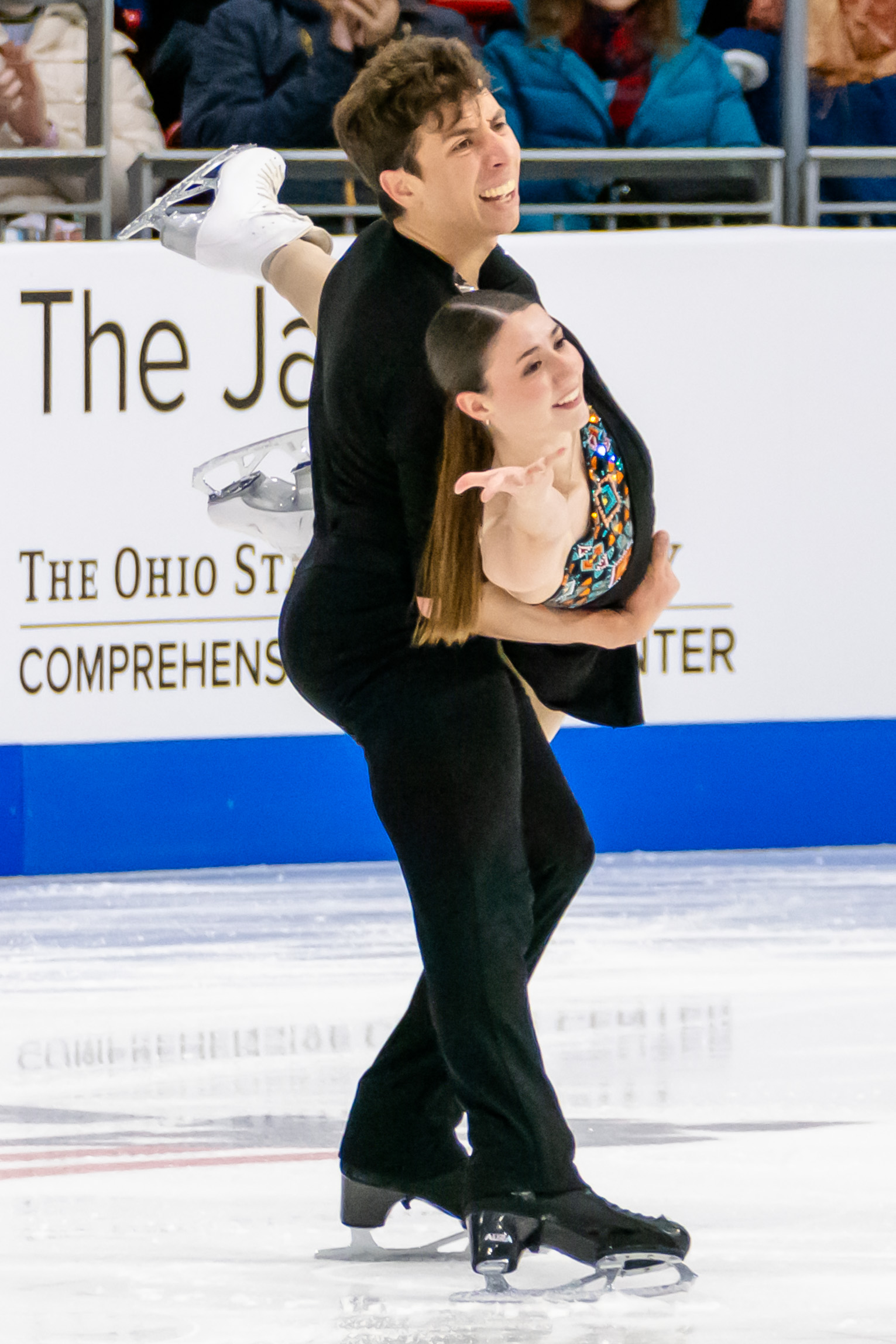
- Plazas/Fernandez at 2025 Skate America

Personal information
- Born: September 29, 1995 (age 31) Hialeah, Florida, U.S
- Home town: Miami, Florida, U.S
- Height: 5 ft 7 in (1.70 m)

Figure skating career
- Country: United States
- Partner: Valentina Plazas (since 2020); Joy Weinberg (2015–17); Cirinia Gillett (2013–14)
- Coach: Jim Peterson; Amanda Evora; Lisa Kirby
- Skating club: Arctic FSC
- Began skating: 2009

Maximiliano Fernandez (born September 29, 1995) is an American pair skater. With his current skating partner, Valentina Plazas, he is the 2024 U.S. national bronze medalist and a three-time Challenger Series medalist.

With his former partner, Joy Weinberg, he is the 2016 U.S. junior national champion and finished in the top 10 at the 2016 World Junior Figure Skating Championships.

== Personal life ==
Fernandez was born on September 29, 1995, in Hialeah, Florida, to parents Stella, a former ballet dancer, and Alex. He has a sister, Daniella, who also competed in figure skating. Fernandez is of Peruvian descent on his mother's side, and Cuban descent on his father's.

Fernandez is a 2014 graduate of Coral Reef Senior High School and currently attends Miami Dade College.

== Career ==
=== Early career ===
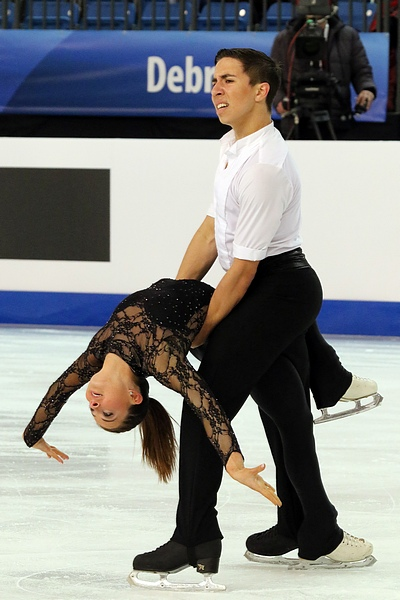
Weinberg/Fernandez at 2016 Junior Worlds

Fernandez's first pairs partner was Cirinia Gillett with whom he won the silver medal at the 2014 U.S. Novice Championships.

In 2015, following his split with Gillett, Fernandez teamed up with Joy Weinberg. They won the 2016 U.S. Junior Championships and competed at the 2016 World Junior Championships, finishing tenth.

=== 2020–21 season: Debut of Plazas/Fernandez ===
In February 2020, Fernandez teamed up with Valentina Plazas.

Plazas/Fernandez debuted together at the 2021 U.S. Championship Series on the junior level, winning the bronze medal. They went on to win the bronze medal at the 2021 U.S. Junior Championships.

=== 2021–22 season ===
Plazas/Fernandez began their season by winning the silver medal at both the 2021 USCS Nevada and USCS Massachusetts. Debuting as a senior pair team at the 2022 U.S. Championships, Plazas/Fernandez finished sixth.

=== 2022–23 season: Senior international debut ===
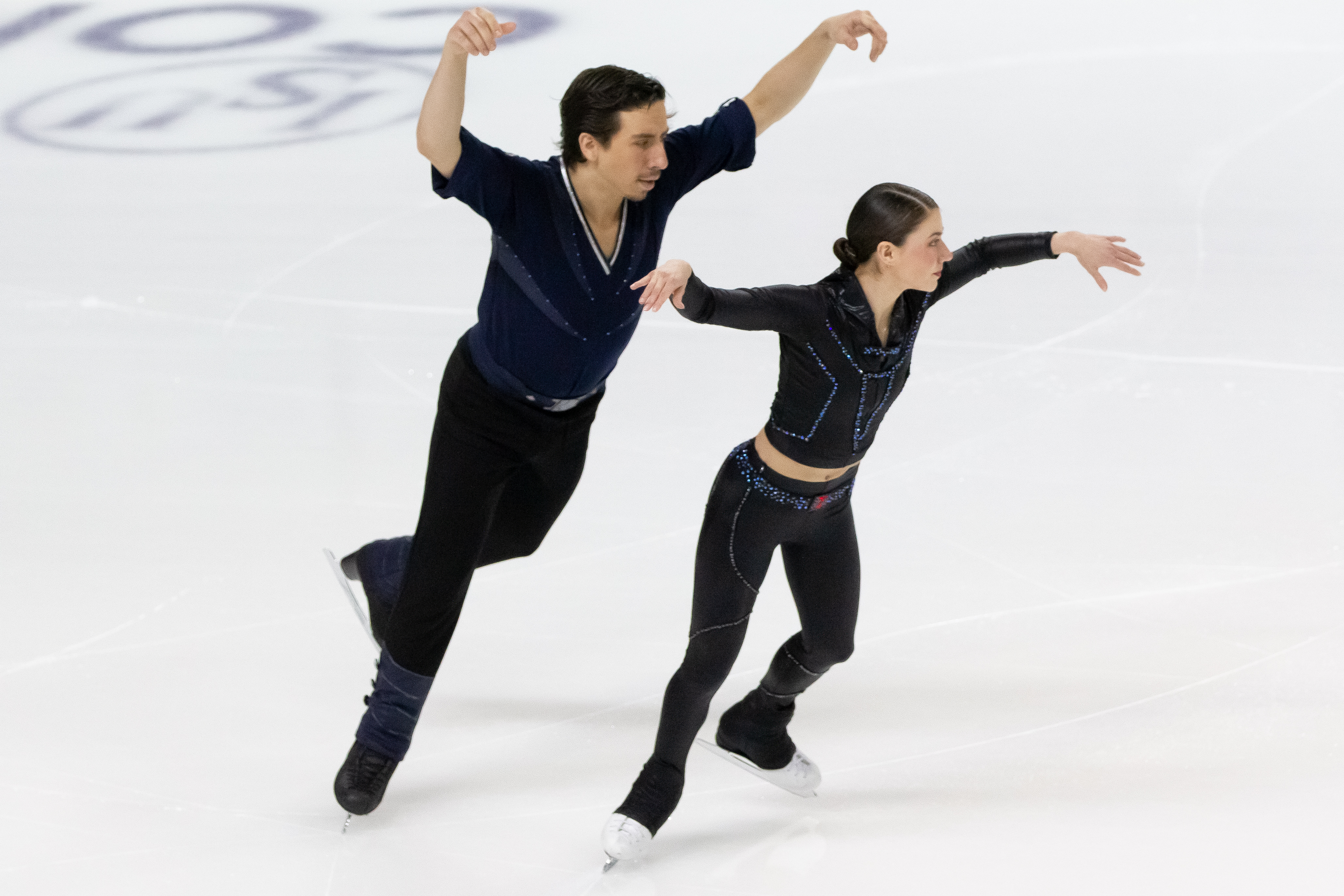
Plazas and Fernandez competing their free skate at the 2023 Four Continents Championships

Plazas/Fernandez began the season at the 2022 John Nicks Pairs Challenge and the 2022 CS U.S. Classic, winning bronze at both events. They then went on to place fifth at the 2022 CS Finlandia Trophy.

Making their debut on the Grand Prix series, Plazas/Fernandez competed at 2022 Skate America, where they finished sixth. Additionally, following they were called up to compete at 2022 Skate Canada International following the withdrawal of U.S. pair team McBeath/Bartholomay. They placed fifth at the event.

At the 2023 U.S. Championships, Plazas/Fernandez placed fifth. Plazas/Fernandez were then selected to compete at the 2023 Four Continents Championships in Colorado Springs, Colorado, where they finished fifth, scoring a personal best combined total score in the process.

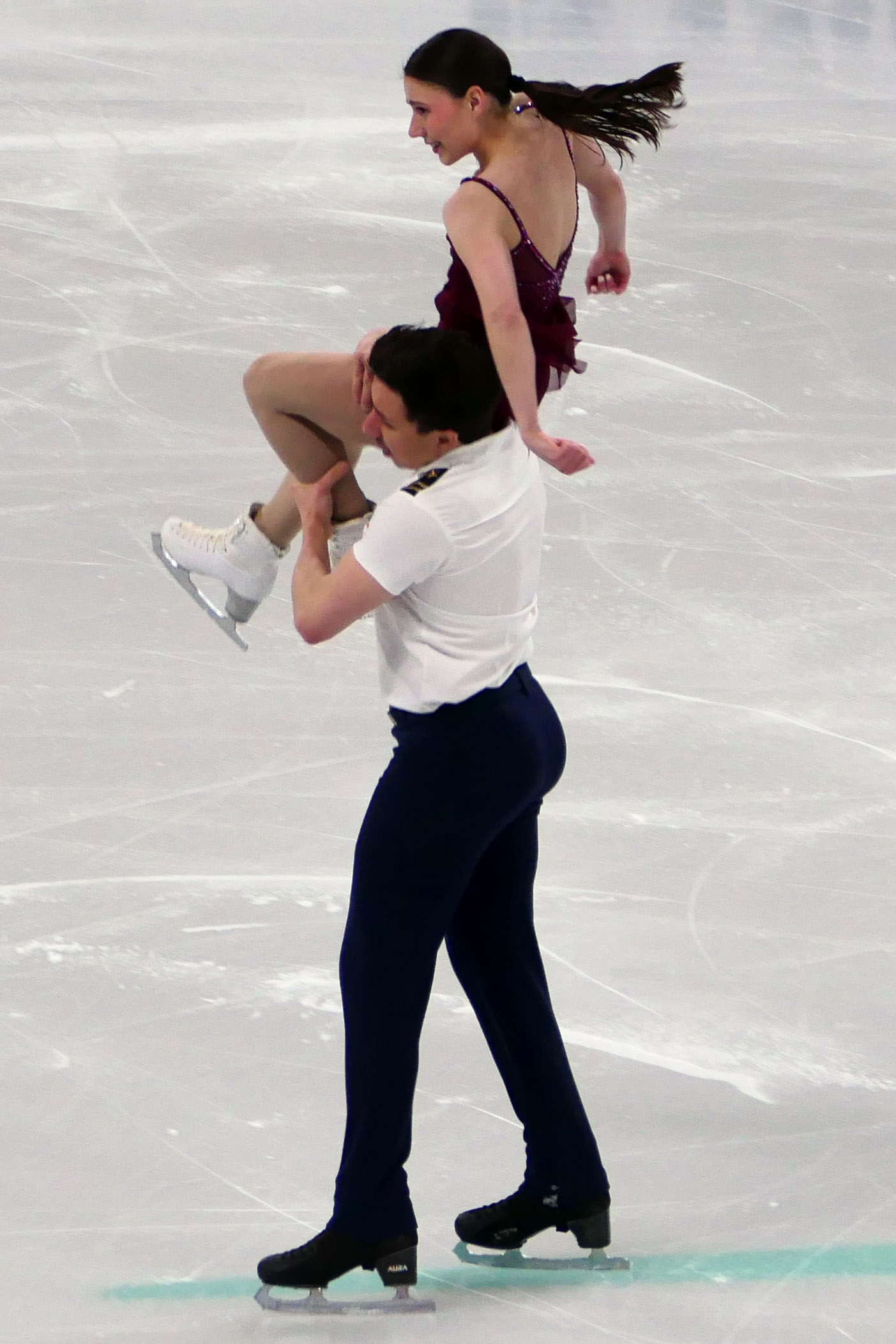
Plazas and Fernandez during their free skate at the 2024 World Championships

=== 2023–24 season: U.S. national bronze ===
Beginning the season at the 2023 CS Nebelhorn Trophy, Plazas/Fernandez were seventh. On the Grand Prix, they were fourth at the 2023 Skate America. They finished fourth as well at the 2023 Grand Prix de France. “We worked on our jumps with Tomas Verner and hope to work with him again,” said Fernandez. “The technical is our weak spot.” At the 2023 CS Golden Spin of Zagreb, Plazas/Fernandez placed second, earning their second ISU Challenger Series medal.

In advance of the 2024 U.S. Championships, Plazas/Fernandez were preemptively named to the American team for the 2024 Four Continents Championships, which were to be held in Shanghai the weekend after the national championships. At the national championships, they came fourth in both segments and won the bronze medal. Fernandez called it "surreal" and "a very humbling experience" to finally reach the national championship podium. They were ninth at the Four Continents Championships.

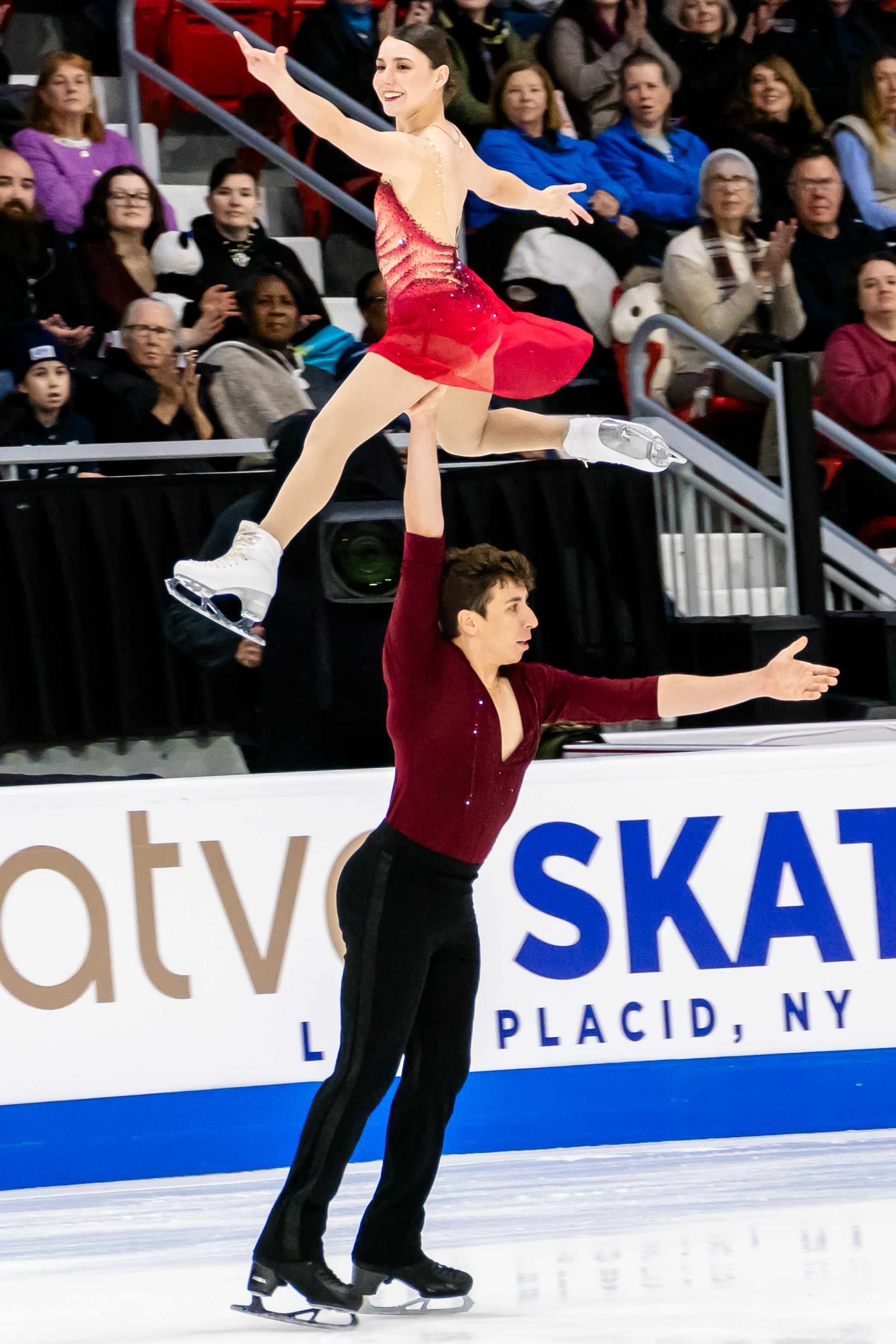
Plazas and Fernandez performing a pair lift during their short program at the 2025 Skate America

Plazas/Fernandez concluded the season by making their World Championship debut at the 2024 edition in Montreal. They finished thirteenth.

=== 2024–25 season: Struggles with injury ===
Although Plazas/Fernandez were scheduled to compete on the Grand Prix circuit at the 2024 NHK Trophy and the 2024 Cup of China, they announced via their shared Instagram account in early October that they had withdrawn from both events due Fernandez being plagued by an injury. The pair ultimately sat out for the remainder of the season to focus on Fernandez's recovery.

=== 2025–26 season: Return to competition ===
Plazas/Fernandez returned to competition in September 2025 at the 2025 CS Kinoshita Group Cup, where they placed fourth. They followed this up with another fourth-place finish at the 2025 Tayside Trophy.

Selected as host picks at 2025 Skate America, Plazas/Fernandez finished the event in seventh place. They subsequently went on to win the silver medal at 2025 CS Golden Spin of Zagreb.

In January, Plazas/Fernandez competed at the 2026 U.S. Championships, where they finished in sixth place.

=== 2026–27 season ===
Plazas/Fernandez opened their season placing 5th at the 2026 Kinoshita Group Cup.

== Programs ==
=== Pair skating with Valentina Plazas ===
Season	Short program	Free skating	Exhibition
2025–2026	Rhapsody on a Theme of Paganini Op. 43, Variations 11 & 8 by Sergei Rachmaninoff choreo. by Amanda Evora & Jim Peterson; Never Enough (from The Greatest Showman) by Benj Pasek, Justin Paul, & Alex Lacamoire performed by Kelly Clarkson choreo. by Jim Peterson	Lion King; Burden of Pride; Reflections of Mufasa; Rafiki's Fireflies; A Story of a Great King; Remember by Hans Zimmer choreo. by Christina Carreira & Anthony Ponomarenko	Quizás, Quizás, Quizás by Osvaldo Farrés performed by Michael Bublé
2024–2025	Never Enough (from The Greatest Showman) by Benj Pasek, Justin Paul, & Alex Lacamoire performed by Kelly Clarkson choreo. by Jim Peterson	Dune; Gob Jabbar; Ripples in the Sand; Leaving Caladan; Seduction; A Time of Quiet Between the Storms; Kiss the Ring by Hans Zimmer choreo. by Christina Carreira & Anthony Ponomarenko	
2023–2024	Rhapsody on a Theme of Paganini Op. 43, Variations 11 & 8 by Sergei Rachmaninoff choreo. by Amanda Evora & Jim Peterson	Top Gun: Maverick; The Man, the Legend / Touchdown by Hans Zimmer, Harold Faltermeyer, Michael Tucker, & Lady Gaga; Hold My Hand by Lady Gaga & Michael Tucker choreo. by Amanda Evora & Jim Peterson	Dos Oruguitas (from Encanto) by Lin-Manuel Miranda performed by Lang Lang & Sebastián Yatra
2022–2023	Maria (from West Side Story) performed by Ansel Elgort choreo. by Amanda Evora & Jim Peterson	Captain America Suite (from Captain America: The First Avenger); Avengers Suite (from Avengers: Infinity War) by Alan Silvestri choreo. by Amanda Evora & Jim Peterson	
2021–2022	Wedding Pas de Deux (The Sleeping Beauty) by Pyotr Ilyich Tchaikovsky choreo. by Amanda Evora & Jim Peterson	Aladdin by Alan Menken choreo. by Amanda Evora & Jim Peterson	
2020–2021	Steppin' Out with My Baby by Tony Bennett choreo. by Amanda Evora & Jim Peterson	Aladdin by Alan Menken choreo. by Amanda Evora & Jim Peterson	

== Competitive highlights ==
- GP – Event of the ISU Grand Prix Series
- CS – Event of the ISU Challenger Series
- WD – Withdrew from competition

=== Pair skating with Valentina Plazas ===
Competition placements at senior level
Season	2021–22	2022–23	2023–24	2025–26	2026–27
World Championships			13th		
Four Continents Championships		5th	9th		
U.S. Championships	6th	5th	3rd	6th	
GP Cup of China					6th
GP Finland					6th
GP France			4th		
GP Skate America		6th	4th	7th	
GP Skate Canada		5th			
CS Finlandia Trophy		5th			
CS Golden Spin of Zagreb			2nd	2nd	
CS Kinoshita Group Cup				4th	5th
CS Nebelhorn Trophy			7th		6th
CS U.S. Classic		3rd			
John Nicks Pairs Challenge		3rd	3rd		
Tayside Trophy				4th	

Competition placements at junior level
Season	2020–21
U.S. Championships	3rd

=== Pair skating with Joy Weinberg ===
JGP: Junior Grand Prix

International: Junior
Event	15–16	16–17
Junior Worlds	10th	
JGP Poland	7th	
JGP United States	2nd	
National
U.S. Championships	1st J	9th
Levels: J = Junior

=== Pairs with Gillett ===
International: Junior
Event	14–15
JGP Czech Republic	6th
National
U.S. Championships	5th J
Levels: J = Junior

== Detailed results ==
Current personal best scores are highlighted in bold.

ISU personal best scores in the +5/-5 GOE System
Segment	Type	Score	Event
Total	**TSS**	**174.15**	2025 CS Golden Spin of Zagreb
Short program	**TSS**	**61.64**	2024 World Championships
Short program	TES	34.45	2022 CS Finlandia Trophy
Short program	PCS	29.22	2024 World Championships
Free skating	**TSS**	**122.00**	2025 CS Golden Spin of Zagreb
Free skating	TES	62.06	2025 CS Golden Spin of Zagreb
Free skating	PCS	59.94	2025 CS Golden Spin of Zagreb

=== Pair skating with Valentina Plazas ===
==== Senior results ====
Results in the 2025–26 season
Date	Event	SP		FS		Total	
Date	Event	P	Score	P	Score	P	Score
Sep 5–7, 2025	(Japan) 2025 CS Kinoshita Group Cup	4	59.64	4	107.61	4	167.25
Oct 11–12, 2025	(United Kingdom) 2025 Tayside Trophy	3	63.99	3	115.19	4	179.18
Nov 14–16, 2025	(United States) 2025 Skate America	7	56.85	6	106.41	7	163.26
Dec 3–6, 2025	(Croatia) 2025 CS Golden Spin of Zagreb	4	61.17	2	122.00	2	183.17
Jan 4–11, 2026	(United States) 2026 U.S. Championships	4	67.03	6	113.77	6	180.80

Results in the 2026–27 season
Date	Event	SP		FS		Total	
Date	Event	P	Score	P	Score	P	Score
Sep 4–6, 2026	(Japan) 2026 CS Kinoshita Group Cup	4	61.15	6	97.84	5	158.99
Sep 24–26, 2026	(Germany) 2026 CS Nebelhorn Trophy	8	54.55	4	108.02	6	162.57
Nov 6–8, 2026	2026 Cup of China	6	59.48	7	98.71	6	158.19
Nov 20–21, 2026	(Finland) 2026 Finlandia Trophy	5	60.87	6	93.11	6	153.98

2023–24 season
Date	Event	SP	FS	Total
18–24 March 2024	2024 World Championships	13; **61.64**	14; 112.51	13; **174.15**
30 Jan. – 4 Feb. 2024	2024 Four Continents Championships	9; 57.38	9; 103.78	9; 161.16
22–28 January 2024	2024 U. S. Championships	4; 63.18	4; 117.85	3; 181.03
6–9 December 2023	2023 CS Golden Spin of Zagreb	2; 58.11	2; 110.03	2; 168.14
3–5 November 2023	2023 Grand Prix de France	4; 58.46	4; 109.74	4; 168.20
20–22 October 2023	2023 Skate America	7; 49.51	4; 107.57	4; 157.08
September 20–23, 2023	2023 CS Nebelhorn Trophy	7; 54.93	7; **114.44**	7; 169.37
**2022–23 season**
Date	Event	SP	FS	Total
7–12 February 2023	2023 Four Continents Championships	5; 60.07	6; 109.02	5; 169.09
23–29 January 2023	2023 U. S. Championships	4; 63.45	6; 112.89	5; 176.34
4–9 October 2022	2022 Skate Canada International	5; 55.70	5; 108.44	5; 164.14
21–23 October 2022	2022 Skate America	8; 47.32	4; 96.23	6; 143.55
4–9 October 2022	2022 CS Finlandia Trophy	4; 60.40	6; 101.58	5; 161.98
12–16 September 2022	2022 CS U.S. Classic	3; 56.20	3; 110.05	3; 166.25
8–9 September 2022	2022 John Nicks Pairs Challenge	4; 57.20	3; 108.48	3; 165.68
**2021–22 season**
Date	Event	SP	FS	Total
3–9 January 2022	2022 U. S. Championships	7; 49.80	6; 98.57	6; 148.37

==== Junior results ====
**2020–21 season**
Date	Event	SP	FS	Total
11–21 January 2021	2021 U. S. Championships	4; 47.07	3; 90.22	3; 137.29
