= 2022 Skate America =

Figure skating competition

- Type: Grand Prix
- Date: October 21 – 23
- Season: 2022–23
- Location: Norwood, Massachusetts, United States
- Host: U.S. Figure Skating
- Venue: Tenley E. Albright Performance Center

Champions
- Men's singles: (United States) Ilia Malinin
- Women's singles: (Japan) Kaori Sakamoto
- Pairs: (United States) Alexa Knierim / Brandon Frazier
- Ice dance: (United States) Madison Chock / Evan Bates
- Previous: 2021 Skate America
- Next: 2023 Skate America
- Next Grand Prix: 2022 Skate Canada International

The 2022 Skate America was the first event of the 2022–23 ISU Grand Prix of Figure Skating: a senior-level international invitational competition series. It was held at the Tenley E. Albright Performance Center in Norwood, Massachusetts, from October 21–23. Medals were awarded in men's singles, women's singles, pair skating, and ice dance. Skaters earned points toward qualifying for the 2022–23 Grand Prix Final.

== Entries ==
The International Skating Union announced the preliminary assignments on July 22, 2022.

Country	Men	Women	Pairs	Ice dance
Australia				Holly Harris / Jason Chan
Canada	Wesley Chiu; Roman Sadovsky		Kelly Ann Laurin / Loucas Éthier; Deanna Stellato-Dudek / Maxime Deschamps	Marie-Jade Lauriault / Romain Le Gac; Carolane Soucisse / Shane Firus
Cyprus		Marilena Kitromilis		
Czech Republic		Eliška Březinová		
Estonia	Mihhail Selevko			
France				Loïcia Demougeot / Théo le Mercier
Germany		Nicole Schott	Letizia Roscher / Luis Schuster	Jennifer Janse van Rensburg / Benjamin Steffan
Italy	Daniel Grassl		Anna Valesi / Manuel Piazza	
Japan	Kao Miura; Sena Miyake; Koshiro Shimada	Rino Matsuike; Kaori Sakamoto		Kana Muramoto / Daisuke Takahashi
Mexico	Donovan Carrillo			
Poland		Ekaterina Kurakova		
South Korea	Cha Jun-hwan	Lee Hae-in; Park Yeon-jeong; Yun Ah-sun		
Sweden			Greta Crafoord / John Crafoord	
Ukraine				Mariia Holubtsova / Kyryl Bielobrov
United States	Liam Kapeikis; Ilia Malinin; Dinh Tran	Amber Glenn; Isabeau Levito; Gracie Gold	Alexa Knierim / Brandon Frazier; Maria Mokhova / Ivan Mokhov; Valentina Plazas / Maximiliano Fernandez	Madison Chock / Evan Bates; Kaitlin Hawayek / Jean-Luc Baker; Lorraine McNamara / Anton Spiridonov

=== Changes to preliminary assignments ===
Discipline	Withdrew		Added		Notes	Ref.
Discipline	Date	Skater(s)	Date	Skater(s)	Notes	Ref.
Men	July 26	(Australia) Brendan Kerry	September 1	(Japan) Kao Miura		
Pairs	August 1	(Australia) Anastasia Golubeva / Hektor Giotopoulos Moore	September 21	(Canada) Kelly Ann Laurin / Loucas Éthier	Remained in Juniors	
Ice dance	August 12	(Ukraine) Oleksandra Nazarova / Maxim Nikitin	August 23	(Ukraine) Mariia Holubtsova / Kyryl Bielobrov	Nazarova & Nikitin retired.	
Ice dance	—		August 16	(United States) Lorraine McNamara / Anton Spiridonov	Host pick	
Pairs	August 26	(Ukraine) Sofiia Holichenko / Artem Darenskyi	September 9	(Germany) Letizia Roscher / Luis Schuster	Visa issues	
Women	—		August 31	(United States) Gracie Gold	Host pick	
Ice dance	September 1	(Lithuania) Allison Reed / Saulius Ambrulevičius	September 8	(Australia) Holly Harris / Jason Chan		
Men	—		September 8	(United States) Eric Sjoberg	Host picks	
Pairs	—		September 21	(United States) Valentina Plazas / Maximiliano Fernandez	Host picks	
Pairs	October 7	(Netherlands) Daria Danilova / Michel Tsiba	October 10	(Italy) Anna Valesi / Manuel Piazza	Visa issues	
Women	October 11	(China) Zhu Yi	October 13	(Czech Republic) Eliška Březinová	Injury	
Men	October 14	(Japan) Yuma Kagiyama	October 14	(Japan) Koshiro Shimada	Injury	
Men	October 17	(United States) Eric Sjoberg	October 17	(United States) Dinh Tran		
Pairs	October 18	(United States) Anastasiia Smirnova / Danylo Siianytsia	October 18	(United States) Maria Mokhova / Ivan Mokhov		

== Results ==
=== Men's singles ===
Rank	Skater	Nation	Total points	SP		FS	
1st place, gold medalist(s)	Ilia Malinin	United States	280.37	4	86.08	1	194.29
2nd place, silver medalist(s)	Kao Miura	Japan	273.19	1	94.96	2	178.23
3rd place, bronze medalist(s)	Cha Jun-hwan	South Korea	264.05	2	94.44	3	169.61
4	Daniel Grassl	Italy	257.68	3	88.43	4	169.25
5	Roman Sadovsky	Canada	225.41	5	78.15	7	147.26
6	Wesley Chiu	Canada	219.90	9	71.58	6	148.32
7	Liam Kapeikis	United States	219.50	8	74.29	8	145.21
8	Sena Miyake	Japan	215.74	6	77.87	9	137.87
9	Koshiro Shimada	Japan	215.12	12	62.54	5	152.58
10	Dinh Tran	United States	199.68	11	64.99	10	134.69
11	Mihhail Selevko	Estonia	191.80	7	75.75	12	116.05
12	Donovan Carrillo	Mexico	188.28	10	69.18	11	119.10

=== Women's singles ===
Rank	Skater	Nation	Total points	SP		FS	
1st place, gold medalist(s)	Kaori Sakamoto	Japan	217.61	1	71.72	1	145.89
2nd place, silver medalist(s)	Isabeau Levito	United States	206.66	2	71.30	2	135.36
3rd place, bronze medalist(s)	Amber Glenn	United States	197.61	3	68.42	3	129.19
4	Lee Hae-in	South Korea	179.50	4	66.24	5	113.26
5	Ekaterina Kurakova	Poland	178.68	6	63.65	4	115.03
6	Gracie Gold	United States	174.09	5	64.18	6	109.91
7	Nicole Schott	Germany	160.35	10	56.47	8	103.88
8	Park Yeon-jeong	South Korea	158.58	7	60.04	9	98.54
9	Yun Ah-sun	South Korea	156.70	11	47.98	7	108.72
10	Eliška Březinová	Czech Republic	153.57	9	56.65	10	96.92
11	Marilena Kitromilis	Cyprus	135.48	12	46.01	11	89.47
WD	Rino Matsuike	Japan	withdrew	8	59.50	withdrew from competition	

=== Pairs ===
Rank	Team	Nation	Total points	SP		FS	
1st place, gold medalist(s)	Alexa Knierim / Brandon Frazier	United States	201.39	1	75.19	1	126.20
2nd place, silver medalist(s)	Deanna Stellato-Dudek / Maxime Deschamps	Canada	197.89	2	73.05	2	124.84
3rd place, bronze medalist(s)	Kelly Ann Laurin / Loucas Éthier	Canada	156.94	4	52.59	3	104.35
4	Maria Mokhova / Ivan Mokhov	United States	145.23	6	49.21	5	96.02
5	Anna Valesi / Manuel Piazza	Italy	144.47	5	49.93	6	94.54
6	Valentina Plazas / Maximiliano Fernandez	United States	143.55	8	47.32	4	96.23
7	Letizia Roscher / Luis Schuster	Germany	135.88	3	54.87	8	81.01
8	Greta Crafoord / John Crafoord	Sweden	130.62	7	48.28	7	82.34

=== Ice dance ===
Rank	Team	Nation	Total points	RD		FD	
1st place, gold medalist(s)	Madison Chock / Evan Bates	United States	202.80	1	82.63	2	120.17
2nd place, silver medalist(s)	Kaitlin Hawayek / Jean-Luc Baker	United States	202.07	2	79.12	1	122.95
3rd place, bronze medalist(s)	Marie-Jade Lauriault / Romain Le Gac	Canada	178.30	3	72.12	3	106.18
4	Loïcia Demougeot / Théo Le Mercier	France	170.89	7	65.90	4	104.99
5	Holly Harris / Jason Chan	Australia	170.20	4	71.58	8	98.62
6	Kana Muramoto / Daisuke Takahashi	Japan	169.68	5	69.67	6	100.01
7	Lorraine McNamara / Anton Spiridonov	United States	167.05	6	66.07	5	100.98
8	Carolane Soucisse / Shane Firus	Canada	163.65	9	64.09	7	99.56
9	Jennifer Janse van Rensburg / Benjamin Steffan	Germany	160.26	8	65.42	9	94.84
10	Mariia Holubtsova / Kyryl Bielobrov	Ukraine	152.31	10	61.21	10	91.10
