= 2023 Skate America =

Figure skating competition

- Type: Grand Prix
- Date: October 20 – 22
- Season: 2023–24
- Location: Allen, Texas, United States
- Host: U.S. Figure Skating
- Venue: Credit Union of Texas Event Center

Champions
- Men's singles: (United States) Ilia Malinin
- Women's singles: (Belgium) Loena Hendrickx
- Pairs: (Germany) Annika Hocke / Robert Kunkel
- Ice dance: (United States) Madison Chock / Evan Bates
- Previous: 2022 Skate America
- Next: 2024 Skate America
- Next Grand Prix: 2023 Skate Canada International

The 2023 Skate America was the first event of the 2023–24 ISU Grand Prix of Figure Skating: a senior-level international invitational competition series. It was held at the Credit Union of Texas Event Center in Allen, Texas, from October 20–22. Medals were awarded in men's singles, women's singles, pair skating, and ice dance. Skaters earned points toward qualifying for the 2023–24 Grand Prix Final.

== Entries ==
The International Skating Union announced the preliminary assignments on June 28, 2023.

Country	Men	Women	Pairs	Ice dance
Australia				Holly Harris / Jason Chan
Azerbaijan	Vladimir Litvintsev			
Belgium		Loena Hendrickx		
Canada	Stephen Gogolev		Lia Pereira / Trennt Michaud	Marjorie Lajoie /Zachary Lagha
China		An Xiangyi		
Czech Republic				Natálie Taschlerová / Filip Taschler; Kateřina Mrázková / Daniel Mrázek
Estonia		Niina Petrõkina		
France	Kévin Aymoz			Evgeniia Lopareva / Geoffrey Brissaud
Georgia	Nika Egadze			
Germany			Annika Hocke / Robert Kunkel	
Great Britain			Anastasia Vaipan-Law / Luke Digby	
Italy			Irma Caldara / Riccardo Maglio	
Japan	Shun Sato; Tatsuya Tsuboi; Nozomu Yoshioka	Mone Chiba; Mana Kawabe; Hana Yoshida		
Latvia	Deniss Vasiļjevs			
Poland		Ekaterina Kurakova		
South Korea		Wi Seo-yeong; You Young		Hannah Lim / Ye Quan
Spain				Olivia Smart / Tim Dieck
Sweden	Andreas Nordebäck			
United States	Ilia Malinin; Maxim Naumov; Andrew Torgashev	Amber Glenn; Isabeau Levito; Clare Seo	Chelsea Liu / Balázs Nagy; Isabelle Martins / Ryan Bedard; Valentina Plazas / Maximiliano Fernandez	Oona Brown / Gage Brown; Madison Chock / Evan Bates; Caroline Green / Michael Parsons

=== Changes to preliminary assignments ===
Discipline	Withdrew		Added		Notes	Ref.
Discipline	Date	Skater(s)	Date	Skater(s)	Notes	Ref.
Women	—		August 30	(United States) Clare Seo	Host picks	
Pairs	—		August 30	(United States) Chelsea Liu / Balázs Nagy	Host picks	
Pairs	—		September 15	(United States) Evelyn Grace Hanns / Danny Neudecker	Host picks	
Ice dance	—		September 15	(United States) Oona Brown / Gage Brown	Host picks	
Pairs	October 12	(Japan) Riku Miura / Ryuichi Kihara	October 13	(United Kingdom) Anastasia Vaipan-Law / Luke Digby	Back injury (Kihara)	
Pairs	October 13	(United States) Evelyn Grace Hanns / Danny Neudecker	October 13	(United States) Isabelle Martins / Ryan Bedard	Host picks	
Pairs	October 16	(Netherlands) Nika Osipova / Dmitry Epstein	—			

== Results ==
=== Men's singles ===
Rank	Skater	Nation	Total points	SP		FS	
1st place, gold medalist(s)	Ilia Malinin	United States	310.47	1	104.06	1	206.41
2nd place, silver medalist(s)	Kévin Aymoz	France	279.09	2	97.34	2	181.75
3rd place, bronze medalist(s)	Shun Sato	Japan	247.50	3	91.61	4	155.89
4	Nika Egadze	Georgia	237.45	5	85.76	5	151.69
5	Vladimir Litvintsev	Azerbaijan	237.44	8	74.61	3	162.83
6	Nozomu Yoshioka	Japan	233.56	4	87.44	7	146.12
7	Andrew Torgashev	United States	219.67	11	68.71	6	150.96
8	Tatsuya Tsuboi	Japan	216.98	9	72.57	8	144.41
9	Deniss Vasiļjevs	Latvia	215.34	6	75.84	10	139.50
10	Maxim Naumov	United States	210.53	10	70.73	9	139.80
11	Stephen Gogolev	Canada	210.48	7	74.73	11	135.75
12	Andreas Nordebäck	Sweden	198.95	12	66.28	12	132.67

=== Women's singles ===
Rank	Skater	Nation	Total points	SP		FS	
1st place, gold medalist(s)	Loena Hendrickx	Belgium	221.28	1	75.92	1	145.36
2nd place, silver medalist(s)	Isabeau Levito	United States	208.15	3	70.07	2	138.08
3rd place, bronze medalist(s)	Niina Petrõkina	Estonia	194.55	4	65.02	4	129.53
4	Hana Yoshida	Japan	190.98	9	59.40	3	131.58
5	Amber Glenn	United States	189.63	2	71.45	5	118.18
6	Mone Chiba	Japan	177.79	5	64.24	6	113.55
7	Ekaterina Kurakova	Poland	173.75	7	60.45	7	113.30
8	Mana Kawabe	Japan	168.98	6	62.80	8	106.18
9	An Xiangyi	China	165.40	8	59.74	9	105.66
10	Clare Seo	United States	163.77	11	58.14	10	105.63
11	You Young	South Korea	157.36	12	56.21	11	101.15
12	Wi Seo-yeong	South Korea	156.02	10	58.55	12	97.47

=== Pairs ===
Rank	Team	Nation	Total points	SP		FS	
1st place, gold medalist(s)	Annika Hocke / Robert Kunkel	Germany	184.23	1	63.59	1	120.64
2nd place, silver medalist(s)	Lia Pereira / Trennt Michaud	Canada	182.59	2	63.22	2	119.37
3rd place, bronze medalist(s)	Chelsea Liu / Balázs Nagy	United States	177.66	3	61.23	3	116.43
4	Valentina Plazas / Maximiliano Fernandez	United States	157.08	7	49.51	4	107.57
5	Isabelle Martins / Ryan Bedard	United States	154.66	4	52.59	5	102.07
6	Irma Caldara / Riccardo Maglio	Italy	138.18	5	52.22	6	85.96
7	Anastasia Vaipan-Law / Luke Digby	United Kingdom	133.84	6	50.60	7	83.24

=== Ice dance ===
Rank	Team	Nation	Total points	RD		FD	
1st place, gold medalist(s)	Madison Chock / Evan Bates	United States	212.96	1	84.87	1	128.09
2nd place, silver medalist(s)	Marjorie Lajoie / Zachary Lagha	Canada	196.99	2	77.80	2	119.19
3rd place, bronze medalist(s)	Evgeniia Lopareva / Geoffrey Brissaud	France	193.47	3	77.20	3	116.27
4	Caroline Green / Michael Parsons	United States	185.07	5	75.05	4	110.02
5	Natálie Taschlerová / Filip Taschler	Czech Republic	184.84	4	75.21	5	109.63
6	Olivia Smart / Tim Dieck	Spain	180.67	6	71.96	6	108.71
7	Oona Brown / Gage Brown	United States	177.21	7	71.34	7	105.87
8	Kateřina Mrázková / Daniel Mrázek	Czech Republic	170.84	8	67.95	9	102.89
9	Hannah Lim / Ye Quan	South Korea	169.11	9	65.49	8	103.62
10	Holly Harris / Jason Chan	Australia	156.98	10	61.99	10	94.99
