= Jason Chan (figure skater) =

Canadian-Australian ice dancer

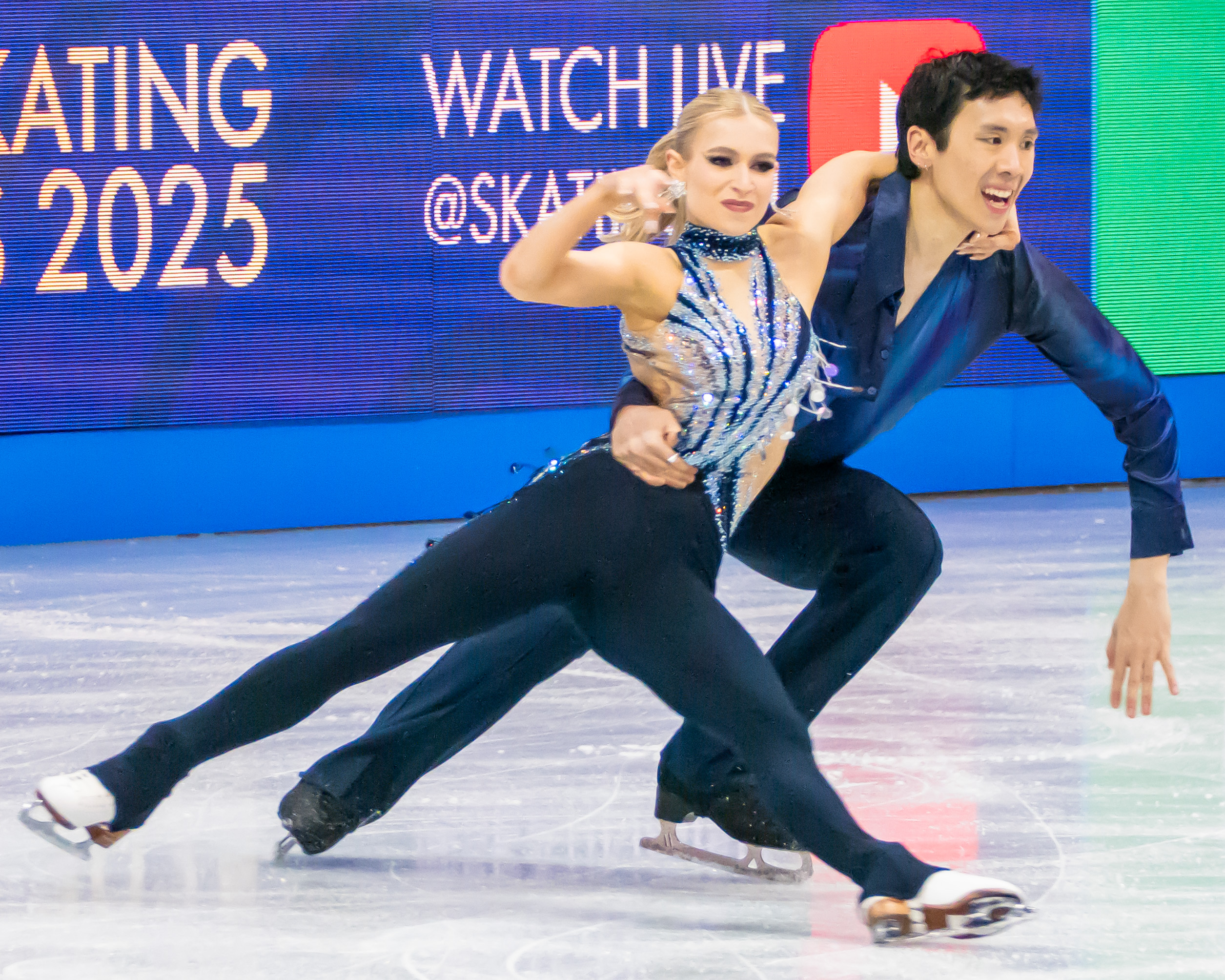
- Holly Harris and Jason Chan during the rhythm dance at the 2025 World Championships

Personal information
- Born: 12 August 1996 (age 30) Montreal, Quebec, Canada
- Height: 1.80 m (5 ft 11 in)

Figure skating career
- Country: Australia (since 2019); Canada (2014–18)
- Discipline: Ice dance
- Partner: Holly Harris (since 2019); Valerie Taillefer (2014–18)
- Coach: Marie-France Dubreuil; Patrice Lauzon; Romain Haguenauer; Pascal Denis; Benjamin Brisebois; Josée Piché
- Skating club: Saint Laurent Figure Skating Club Montreal
- Began skating: 2001

Medal record
Australian Championships
Gold medal – first place	2019 Melbourne	Ice dance
Gold medal – first place	2025 Melbourne	Ice dance

Jason Chan (born 12 August 1996) is a Canadian-Australian ice dancer who currently represents Australia. With partner Holly Harris, he is a two-time Australian national champion (2019, 2025), the 2026 CS Tallinn Trophy, the 2025 CS Trialeti Trophy silver medalist, the 2026 CS Nebelhorn Trophy bronze medalist, and represented Australia at the 2026 Winter Olympics.

With former partner Valérie Taillefer he was the 2014 Canadian novice dance champion.

== Career ==
=== Early career ===
In 2011, Chan trained in Montreal with Valérie Taillefer, competing at the pre-novice level in the Canadian national skating championships in Regina. At the novice level at the 2014 Canadian Championships, the pair won the gold medal. The pair also competed in the Skate Canada Challenge in Regina that year and took first place in the novice dance category. Taillefer/Chan competed for three seasons on the ISU Junior Grand Prix, before the end of their partnership.

=== 2019–20 season: Debut of Harris/Chan ===
Chan formed a dance partnership with Australian ice dancer Holly Harris to represent her country and began training at the Ice Academy of Montreal under coaches Marie-France Dubreuil, Patrice Lauzon, and Romain Haguenauer.

Harris/Chan debuted internationally on the Challenger series at the 2019 CS Warsaw Cup, where they placed ninth, in the process defeating reigning Australian national champions Kerry/Dodds (in eleventh place) by almost 25 points. They went on to win the Australian national title. Harris/Chan made their ISU Championship debut at the 2020 Four Continents Championships in Seoul, where they placed ninth. They were assigned to compete at the World Championships in Montreal, but these were cancelled as a result of the coronavirus pandemic.

=== 2020–21 season: World Championships debut ===
Harris/Chan were assigned to make their Grand Prix debut at the 2020 Skate Canada International, but this event was also cancelled as a result of the coronavirus pandemic. They made their World Championship debut at the 2021 World Championships in Stockholm, placing twenty-fourth.

=== 2021–22 season ===
Harris/Chan began the season at the Skating Club of Boston-hosted Lake Placid Ice Dance International, where they finished in fourth place. They then were assigned to the 2021 CS Nebelhorn Trophy, seeking to qualify a berth for Australia at the 2022 Winter Olympics. They finished in ninth place, making Australia the fourth reserve. Harris/Chan competed at two more Challenger events, finishing thirteenth at the 2021 CS Finlandia Trophy and seventh at the 2021 CS Golden Spin of Zagreb. They then won the bronze medal at the Santa Claus Cup.

Assigned to the 2022 Four Continents Championships in Tallinn, Harris/Chan finished in eighth place. The team concluded the season at the 2022 World Championships, held in Montpellier with Russian dance teams absent due to the International Skating Union banning all Russian athletes due to their country's invasion of Ukraine. Harris/Chan qualified to the free dance for the first time, coming in eighteenth place.

=== 2022–23 season: Grand Prix debut ===
Appearing at the inaugural Britannia Cup, Harris/Chan won the bronze medal. They were seventh at the 2022 CS Nebelhorn Trophy. They were invited to make their Grand Prix debut at the 2022 Skate America, where they finished fourth in the rhythm dance and set a new personal best, clearing the 70-point mark for the first time. They finished fifth overall after errors in the free dance. The following weekend, they were eighth at the 2022 Skate Canada International, their second Grand Prix. After the Grand Prix, Harris/Chan won gold at the Santa Claus Cup and came seventh at the 2022 CS Golden Spin of Zagreb.

Harris/Chan finished eighth at the 2023 Four Continents Championships, and sixteenth at the 2023 World Championships.

=== 2023–24 season ===
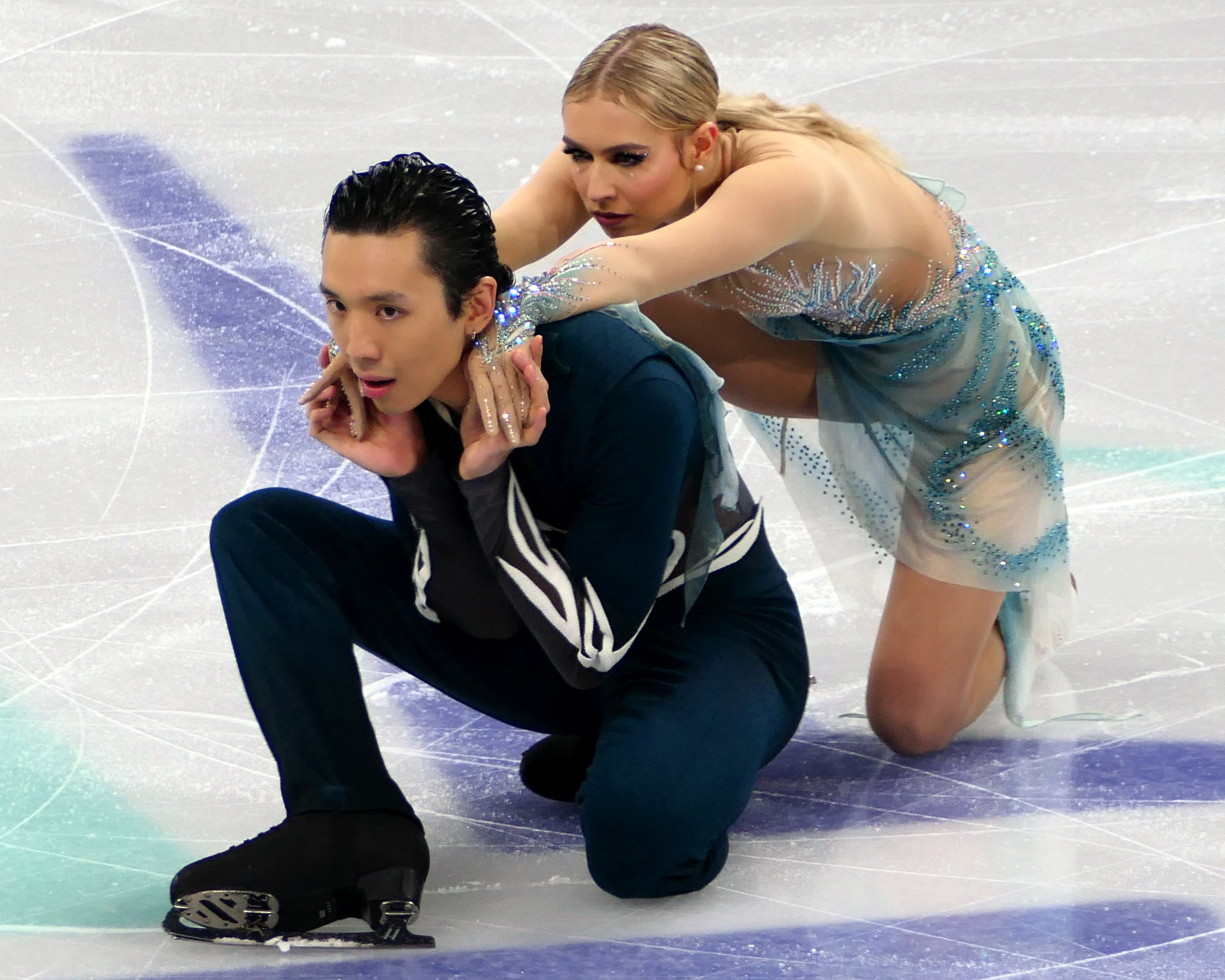
Harris and Chan performing their free dance at the 2024 World Championships

Harris/Chan finished seventh at the 2023 CS Autumn Classic International to start the season, before coming fourth at the Shanghai Trophy invitational. On the Grand Prix, the team came tenth at the 2023 Skate America. They made two further appearances on the Challenger circuit, placing fifteenth at the 2023 CS Warsaw Cup and sixth at the 2023 CS Golden Spin of Zagreb.

In the second half of the season, Harris/Chan were ninth at the 2024 Four Continents Championships and seventeenth at the 2024 World Championships.

=== 2024–25 season ===
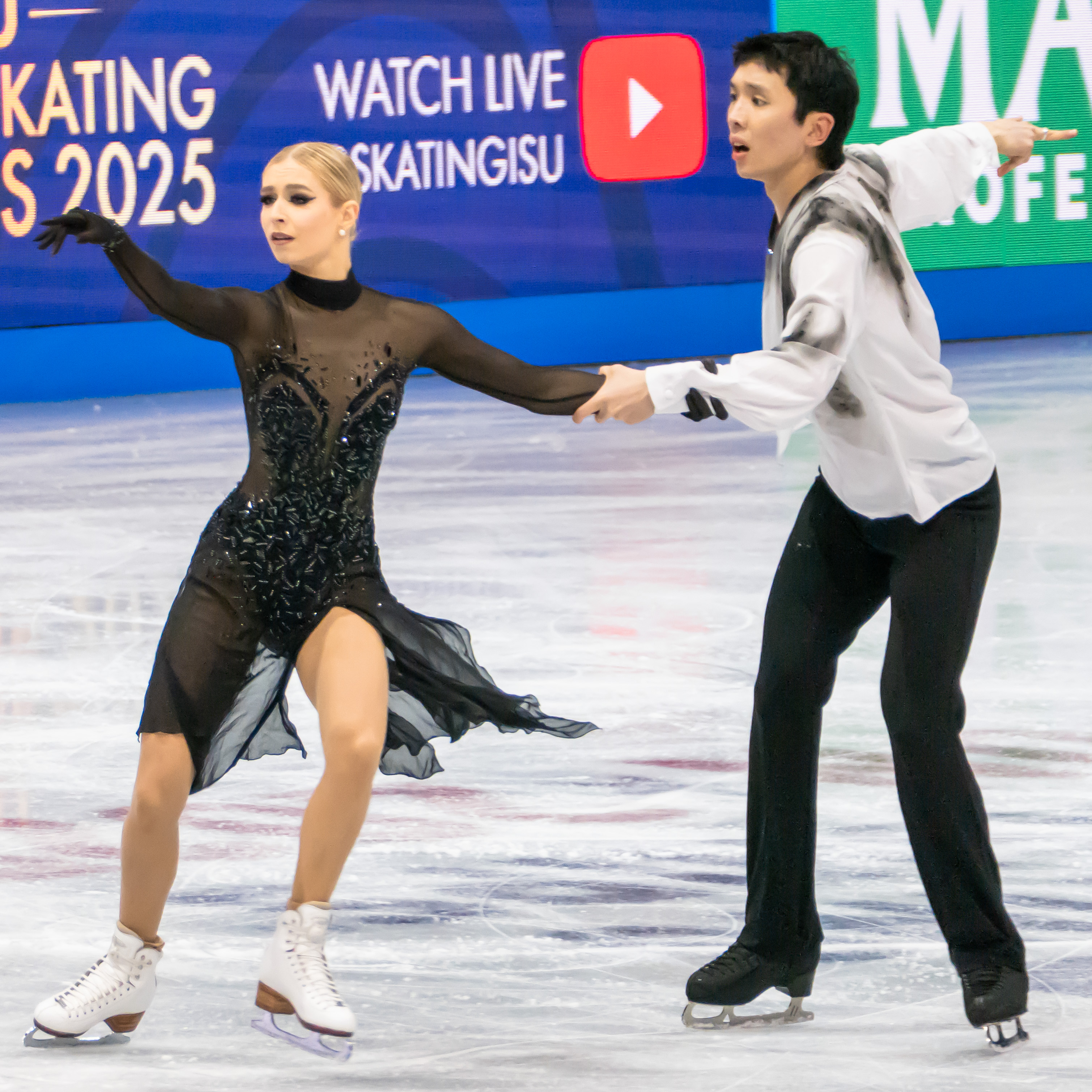
Harris and Chan performing their free dance at the 2025 World Championships

Harris/Chan started the season by finishing seventh at the 2024 CS Budapest Trophy. Following the withdrawal of Darya Grimm / Michail Savitskiy, who elected to remain on the junior level, Harris/Chan were assigned to compete at 2024 Skate Canada International, where they finished in tenth place. They subsequently went on to win the gold medal at the 2024 Ice Challenge and finish fifth at the 2025 CS Tallinn Trophy. A couple weeks following the latter event, Harris/Chan won their second national title at the 2025 Australian Championships

Selected to compete at the 2025 Four Continents Championships, Harris/Chan finished the event in seventh place. They then finished the season by placing nineteenth at the 2025 World Championships.

=== 2025–26 season: Milano Cortina Olympics ===
Harris and Chan opened their season at the 2025 Bolero Cup in September where they placed third.Two weeks later, they took the silver medal at the final Olympic qualifying event, the ISU Skate to Milano. This, in turn, won Australia a spot for ice dance at the 2026 Winter Olympics. The following month, they finished second at 2025 CS Trialeti Trophy, winning their first ISU Challenger Series event medal.

In January, Harris and Chan competed at the 2026 Four Continents Championships where they finished fifth in their sixth appearance at this event. "I’m not fully satisfied with the performance, but I think it was a good steppingstone for us," said Harris after the free dance. “A lot of improvement on different elements, but still room to grow." In February, they competed at the 2026 Winter Olympics, qualifying for the final and placing 18th. They closed the season in March, at the 2026 World Figure Skating Championships in Prague, finishing 15th.

== Programs ==
=== Ice dance with Holly Harris ===
Season	Rhythm dance	Free dance	Exhibition
2025–2026	Waiting for Tonight (Hex's Momentous Radio Mix); Waiting for Tonight; If You Had My Love (Pablo Flores Remix) by Jennifer Lopez; I'm Outta Love (Hex Hector Remix Radio Edit) by Anastacia choreo. by Marie-France Dubreuil	Clair de lune (Pied au Piano) by Claude Debussy, Son Lux, & Chris Pattishall; Bloodstream by Tokio Myers; I Love You Kung Fu by Son Lux & Hanna Benn; Bilune by Karl Hugo; Clair de lune by Claude Debussy choreo. by Jean-Luc Baker	
2024–2025	Take a Chance on Me; Gimme! Gimme! Gimme! (A Man After Midnight); SOS; Voulez-Vous by ABBA choreo. by Marie-France Dubreuil	Clair de lune (Pied au Piano) by Claude Debussy, Son Lux, & Chris Pattishall; Bloodstream by Tokio Myers; I Love You Kung Fu by Son Lux & Hanna Benn; Bilune by Karl Hugo; Clair de lune by Claude Debussy choreo. by Jean-Luc Baker	
2023–2024	Material Girl; Into the Groove; Express Yourself by Madonna choreo. by Marie-France Dubreuil, Samuel Chouinard	Ocean Lullaby by Colossal Trailer Music; Gefion; Freya by Christian Reindl & Lucie Paradis; Vale by Christian Reindl, Lucie Paradis, & Power-Haus choreo. by Marie-France Dubreuil, Samuel Chouinard	Can't Get You Out of My Head; Slow; Spinning Around by Kylie Minogue
2022–2023	Samba: The Beat (Rhythm Samba Instruction) by Watazu; Cha Cha: Cha Cha Danzón (Cha Cha 25) by The Latin Drums; Samba: Suavemente (House Remix) by Fred Perry by Labrinth choreo. by Guillaume Cizeron, Marie-France Dubreuil, Samuel Chouinard, Ginette Cournoyer	Euphoria; I'm Tired by Labrinth and Zendaya; Forever; Formula by Labrinth choreo. by Guillaume Cizeron, Marie-France Dubreuil, Samuel Chouinard, Ginette Cournoyer	Can't Get You Out of My Head; Slow; Spinning Around by Kylie Minogue
2021–2022	Jazz: Can't Get You Out of My Head; Disco: Slow; Blues: Spinning Around by Kylie Minogue	Ain't Nobody by Chaka Khan; I Feel for You by Prince performed by Chaka Khan; Ain't Nobody by Chaka Khan	
2020–2021	Swing: I Hope I Get It; Quickstep: I Can Do That; Foxtrot: One (from A Chorus Line) by Marvin Hamlisch	Australia; Waltzing Matilda; By the Boab Tree performed by Ophelia of the Spirits; Faraway Downs by Felix Meagher, Baz Luhrmann, & Angela Little	
2019–2020	Swing: I Hope I Get It; Quickstep: I Can Do That; Foxtrot: One (from A Chorus Line) by Marvin Hamlisch	Ain't Nobody by Chaka Khan; I Feel for You by Prince performed by Chaka Khan; Ain't Nobody by Chaka Khan	

== Competitive highlights ==
- GP – Event of the ISU Grand Prix Series
- JGP – Event of the ISU Junior Grand Prix Series
- CS – Event of the ISU Challenger Series
- TBD – Assigned
- WD – Withdrew from competition
- C – Event was cancelled

=== Ice dance with Holly Harris (for Australia) ===
Competition placements at senior level
Season	2019–20	2020–21	2021–22	2022–23	2023–24	2024–25	2025–26	2026-27
Winter Olympics							18th	
World Championships	C	24th	18th	16th	17th	19th	14th	
Four Continents Championships	9th		8th	8th	9th	7th	5th	
Australian Championships	1st	C	C			1st		
GP France								8th
GP Skate America				5th	10th			6th
GP Skate Canada				8th		10th		
CS Autumn Classic					7th			
CS Budapest Trophy						7th		
CS Finlandia Trophy			13th					
CS Golden Spin of Zagreb			7th	7th	6th			
CS Nebelhorn Trophy			9th	7th				3rd
CS Tallinn Trophy						5th		1st
CS Trialeti Trophy							2nd	
CS Warsaw Cup	9th				15th			
Bolero Cup							3rd	
Britannia Cup				3rd				
Ice Challenge						1st		
Lake Placid Ice Dance			4th					
Mentor Toruń Cup	12th							
Santa Claus Cup			3rd	1st				
Shanghai Trophy					4th			
Skate to Milano							2nd	

=== Ice dance with Valerie Taillefer (for Canada) ===
Competition placements at junior level
Season	2014–15	2015–16	2016–17	2017–18
Canadian Championships	6th	7th	4th	6th
JGP Latvia				8th
JGP Slovakia		9th		
JGP Slovenia	9th			
Skate Canada Challenge	6th	5th	2nd	5th

== Detailed results ==
ISU personal best scores in the +5/-5 GOE System
Segment	Type	Score	Event
Total	TSS	185.82	2026 CS Tallinn Trophy
Short program	TSS	74.17	2026 CS Tallinn Trophy
Short program	TES	42.72	2026 CS Tallinn Trophy
Short program	PCS	31.47	2025 Skate to Milano
Free skating	TSS	111.65	2026 CS Tallinn Trophy
Free skating	TES	62.96	2025 CS Trialeti Trophy
Free skating	PCS	49.70	2026 CS Tallinn Trophy

=== Ice dance with Holly Harris ===
Results in the 2019–20 season
Date	Event	RD		FD		Total	
Date	Event	P	Score	P	Score	P	Score
Nov 14-17, 2019	(Poland) 2019 CS Warsaw Cup	8	57.92	8	90.56	9	148.48
Nov 29-Dec 6, 2019	(Australia) 2020 Australian Championships	1	63.31	1	93.45	1	156.76
Jan 7-12, 2020	(Poland) 2020 Mentor Toruń Cup	13	50.84	8	91.85	12	142.69
Feb 4-9, 2020	(South Korea) 2020 Four Continents Championships	10	62.83	9	98.22	9	161.05

Results in the 2020–21 season
Date	Event	RD		FD		Total	
Date	Event	P	Score	P	Score	P	Score
Mar 22-28, 2021	(Sweden) 2021 World Championships	24	60.73	—N/a	—N/a	24	60.73

Results in the 2021–22 season
Date	Event	RD		FD		Total	
Date	Event	P	Score	P	Score	P	Score
Aug 12-15, 2021	(United States) 2021 Lake Placid Ice Dance International	5	64.75	4	95.12	4	159.87
Sep 21-25, 2021	(Germany) 2021 CS Nebelhorn Trophy	9	63.05	8	94.16	9	157.21
Oct 7-10, 2021	(Finland) 2021 CS Finlandia Trophy	11	61.62	13	94.08	13	155.70
Dec 6-12, 2021	(Hungary) 2021 Santa Claus Cup	3	67.08	3	105.76	3	172.84
Dec 8-11, 2021	(Croatia) 2021 CS Golden Spin of Zagreb	6	65.54	7	97.94	7	163.48
Jan 17-22, 2022	(Estonia) 2022 Four Continents Championships	8	59.07	8	97.93	8	157.00
Mar 21-27, 2022	(France) 2022 World Championships	19	64.91	17	95.01	18	159.92

Results in the 2022–23 season
Date	Event	RD		FD		Total	
Date	Event	P	Score	P	Score	P	Score
Aug 27-28, 2022	(United Kingdom) 2022 Britannia Cup	2	67.68	3	92.64	3	160.32
Sep 21-24, 2022	(Germany) 2022 CS Nebelhorn Trophy	7	62.04	8	90.62	7	152.66
Oct 21-23, 2022	(United States) 2022 Skate America	4	71.58	8	98.62	5	170.20
Oct 28-30, 2022	2022 Skate Canada International	8	67.68	8	92.24	8	159.92
Nov 28-Dec 4, 2022	(Hungary) 2022 Santa Claus Cup	1	69.29	1	108.87	1	178.16
Dec 7-10, 2022	(Croatia) 2022 CS Golden Spin of Zagreb	6	66.64	7	98.38	7	165.02
Feb 7-12, 2023	(United States) 2023 Four Continents Championships	9	60.71	7	101.98	8	162.69
Mar 20-26, 2022	(Japan) 2023 World Championships	16	64.80	15	104.67	16	169.47

Results in the 2023–24 season
Date	Event	RD		FD		Total	
Date	Event	P	Score	P	Score	P	Score
Sep 14-16, 2023	(Canada) 2023 CS Autumn Classic International	7	58.33	8	84.30	7	142.63
Oct 3-5, 2023	(China) 2023 Shanghai Trophy	4	64.44	4	97.08	4	161.52
Oct 20-22, 2023	(United States) 2023 Skate America	10	61.99	10	94.99	10	156.98
Nov 16-19, 2023	(Poland) 2023 CS Warsaw Cup	12	60.22	17	83.03	15	143.25
Dec 6-9, 2023	(Croatia) 2023 CS Golden Spin of Zagreb	5	66.12	7	97.90	6	164.02
Feb 1-4, 2024	(China) 2024 Four Continents Championships	8	69.34	9	107.00	9	176.34
Mar 18-24, 2024	(Canada) 2024 World Championships	16	71.44	19	103.34	17	174.78

Results in the 2024–25 season
Date	Event	RD		FD		Total	
Date	Event	P	Score	P	Score	P	Score
Oct 11–13, 2024	(Hungary) 2024 CS Budapest Trophy	8	65.68	5	103.46	7	169.14
Oct 25–27, 2024	2024 Skate Canada International	10	64.11	10	99.40	10	163.51
Nov 5–10, 2024	(Austria) 2024 Ice Challenge	1	70.17	1	105.81	1	175.98
Nov 12–17, 2024	(Estonia) 2024 CS Tallinn Trophy	5	70.84	5	108.69	5	179.53
Nov 29 – Dec 6, 2024	(Australia) 2025 Australian Championships	1	71.97	1	112.60	1	184.57
Feb 19–23, 2025	(South Korea) 2025 Four Continents Championships	7	69.37	7	108.75	7	178.12
Mar 24–30, 2025	(United States) 2025 World Championships	18	69.84	19	104.94	19	174.78

Results in the 2025–26 season
Date	Event	RD		FD		Total	
Date	Event	P	Score	P	Score	P	Score
Sep 5–6, 2025	(United Kingdom) 2025 Bolero Cup	3	72.59	3	109.09	3	181.68
Sep 18–21, 2025	(China) 2025 Skate to Milano	2	73.35	2	110.15	2	183.50
Oct 8–11, 2025	(Georgia (country)) 2025 CS Trialeti Trophy	4	69.88	2	110.96	2	180.84
Jan 21–25, 2026	(China) 2026 Four Continents Championships	5	68.33	5	108.75	5	177.08
Feb 9-11, 2026	(Italy) 2026 Winter Olympics	18	67.75	17	108.64	18	176.39
Mar 24–29, 2026	(Czech Republic) 2026 World Championships	16	71.12	15	108.49	14	179.61

Results in the 2026–27 season
Date	Event	RD		FD		Total	
Date	Event	P	Score	P	Score	P	Score
Sep 24–26, 2026	(Germany) 2026 CS Nebelhorn Trophy	4	67.28	3	108.76	3	176.04
Oct 23–25, 2026	2026 Grand Prix de France	7	63.45	7	91.34	8	154.79
Nov 13–15, 2026	(United States) 2026 Skate America	4	71.20	6	101.82	6	173.02
Nov 16–11, 2026	(Estonia) 2026 CS Tallinn Trophy	1	74.17	1	111.65	1	185.82
