= 2022 CS U.S. International Figure Skating Classic =

International figure skating competition

2022 CS U.S. International Classic
- Type: ISU Challenger Series competition
- Date: September 12 – 16
- Season: 2022–23
- Location: Lake Placid, New York, United States
- Host: U.S. Figure Skating
- Venue: Olympic Center

Champions
- Men's singles: (United States) Ilia Malinin
- Women's singles: (South Korea) Kim Ye-lim
- Pairs: (Italy) Rebecca Ghilardi and Filippo Ambrosini
- Ice dance: (United Kingdom) Lilah Fear and Lewis Gibson
- Previous: 2021 U.S. International Classic
- Next CS: 2022 CS Lombardia Trophy

The 2022 U.S. International Figure Skating Classic was a figure skating competition sanctioned by the International Skating Union (ISU), organized and hosted by U.S. Figure Skating, and the first event of the 2022–23 ISU Challenger Series. It was held at the Olympic Center in Lake Placid, New York, in the United States, from September 12 to 15, 2022. Medals were awarded in men's singles, women's singles, pair skating, and ice dance; and skaters earned points towards the World Standings and Season's World Ranking based on their results. Ilia Malinin of the United States won the men's event; Kim Ye-lim of South Korea won the women's event; Rebecca Ghilardi and Filippo Ambrosini of Italy won the pairs event; and Lilah Fear and Lewis Gibson of Great Britain won the ice dance event. The 2022 U.S. International Classic gained media attention when Malinin landed the first ever quadruple Axel in competition.

== Background ==
The inaugural edition of the U.S. International Figure Skating Classic was held in 2012 in Salt Lake City, Utah. The ISU Challenger Series was introduced in 2014. It is a series of international figure skating competitions sanctioned by the International Skating Union (ISU) and organized by ISU member nations. The objective was to ensure consistent organization and structure within a series of international competitions linked together, providing opportunities for senior-level skaters to compete at the international level and also earn points towards the World Standings and Season's World Ranking. The 2022–23 Challenger Series consisted of ten events, of which the U.S. International Classic was the first.

The ISU published the initial list of entrants on August 18, 2022. The 2022 U.S. International Classic was held from September 12 to 15 at the Olympic Center in Lake Placid, New York.

== Required performance elements ==
=== Single skating ===
Men competing in single skating performed their short programs on September 13, while women performed theirs on September 14. Lasting 2 minutes 40 seconds (+/− 10 seconds), the short program had to include the following elements:

For men: one double or triple Axel; one triple or quadruple jump; one jump combination consisting of a double jump and a triple jump, two triple jumps, or a quadruple jump and a double jump or triple jump; one flying spin; one camel spin or sit spin with a change of foot; one spin combination with a change of foot; and a step sequence using the full ice surface.

For women: one double or triple Axel; one triple jump; one jump combination consisting of a double jump and a triple jump, or two triple jumps; one flying spin; one layback spin, sideways leaning spin, camel spin, or sit spin without a change of foot; one spin combination with a change of foot; and one step sequence using the full ice surface.

Men performed their free skates on September 14, while women performed theirs on September 15. Lasting 4 minutes (+/− 10 seconds), the free skate had to include the following: seven jump elements, of which one had to be an Axel-type jump; three spins, of which one had to be a spin combination, one a flying spin, and one a spin with only one position; a step sequence; and a choreographic sequence.

=== Pairs ===
Couples competing in pair skating performed their short programs on September 13. Lasting 2 minutes 40 seconds (+/− 10 seconds), the short program had to include the following elements: one pair lift, one double or triple twist lift, one double or triple throw jump, one double or triple solo jump, one solo spin combination with a change of foot, one death spiral, and a step sequence using the full ice surface.

Couples performed their free skates on September 14. Lasting 4 minutes (+/− 10 seconds), the free skate had to include the following: three pair lifts, of which one has to be a twist lift; two different throw jumps; one solo jump; one jump combination or sequence; one pair spin combination; one death spiral; and a choreographic sequence.

=== Ice dance ===
Couples competing in ice dance performed their rhythm dances on September 14. Lasting 2 minutes 50 seconds (+/− 10 seconds), the rhythm dance had to include at least two different Latin dance styles. Examples of applicable dance styles included the salsa, bachata, merengue, mambo, cha-cha-cha, rhumba, and samba. The required pattern dance element had to be skated to a different Latin style. The rhythm dance had to include the following elements: one pattern dance step sequence, one choreographic rhythm sequence, one dance lift, one set of sequential twizzles, and one step sequence.

Couples then performed their free dances on September 15. Lasting 4 minutes (+/− 10 seconds), the free dance had to include the following: three short dance lifts or one short dance lift and one combination lift; one dance spin; one set of synchronized twizzles; one step sequence while in hold; one turns sequence while on one skate and not in hold; and three choreographic elements.

== Judging ==
Skaters were judged according to the required technical elements of their program (such as jumps and spins), as well as the overall presentation of their program, based on five program components (skating skills, transitions, performance, composition, and musical interpretation). Each technical element in a figure skating performance was assigned a predetermined base point value and scored by a panel of nine judges on a scale from –5 to +5 based on the quality of its execution. Each Grade of Execution (GOE) from –5 to +5 was assigned a value as indicated on the Scale of Values. For example, a triple Axel was worth a base value of 8.00 points, and a GOE of +5 was worth 2.40 points, so a triple Axel with a GOE of +5 earned 10.40 points. The judging panel's GOE for each element was determined by calculating the trimmed mean (the average after discarding the highest and lowest scores). The panel's scores for all elements were added together to generate a Total Elements Score. At the same time, the judges evaluated each performance based on the five aforementioned program components and assigned each a score from 0.25 to 10 in 0.25-point increments. The judging panel's final score for each program component was also determined by calculating the trimmed mean. Those scores were then multiplied by the factor shown on the chart below; the results were added together to generate a total Program Component Score.

Program component factoring
Discipline	Short program or Rhythm dance	Free skate or Free dance
Men	1.00	2.00
Women	0.80	1.60
Pairs	0.80	1.60
Ice dance	0.80	1.20

Deductions were applied for certain violations, such as time infractions, stops and restarts, or falls. The Total Elements Score and Program Component Score were then added together, minus any deductions, to generate a final performance score for each skater or team.

== Medal summary ==
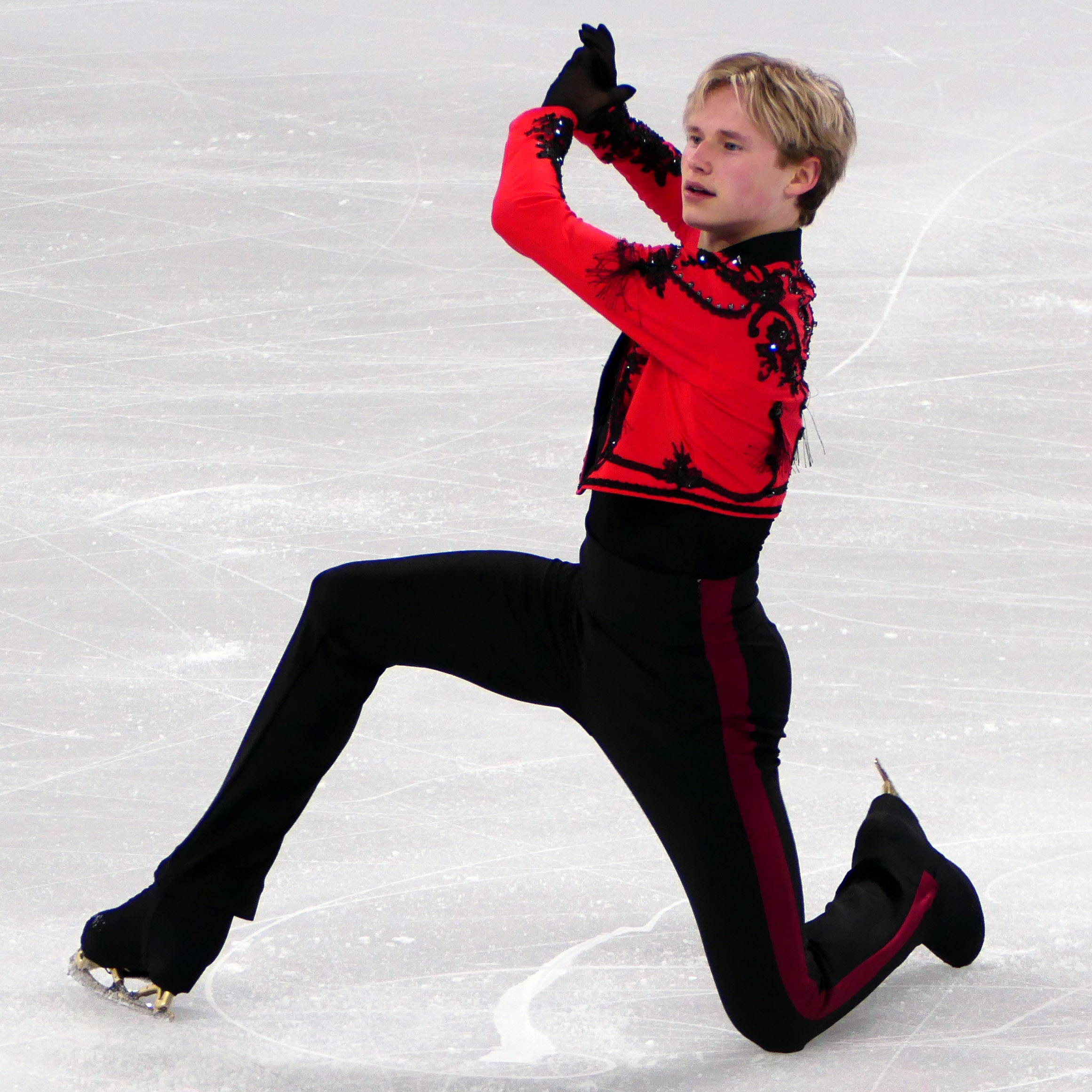
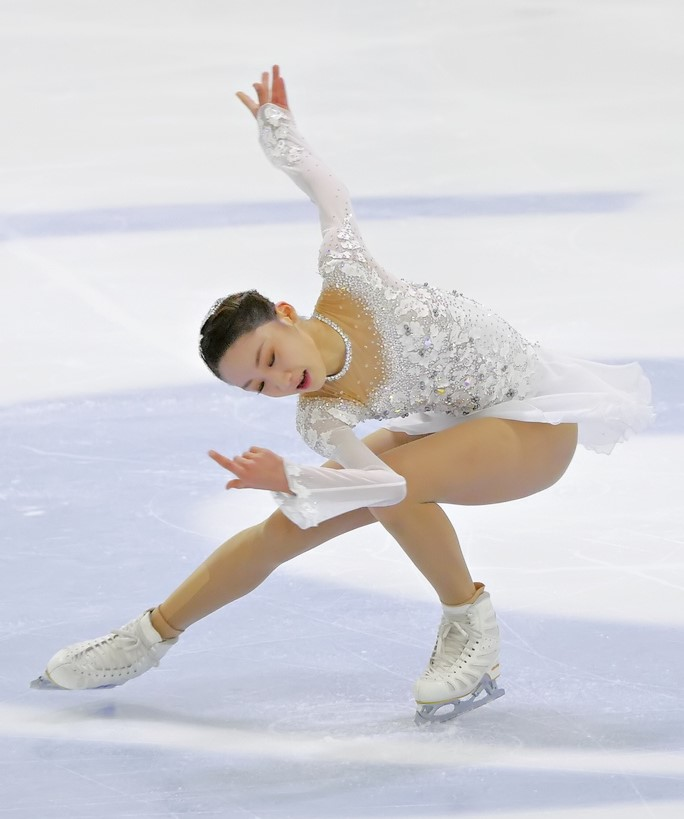
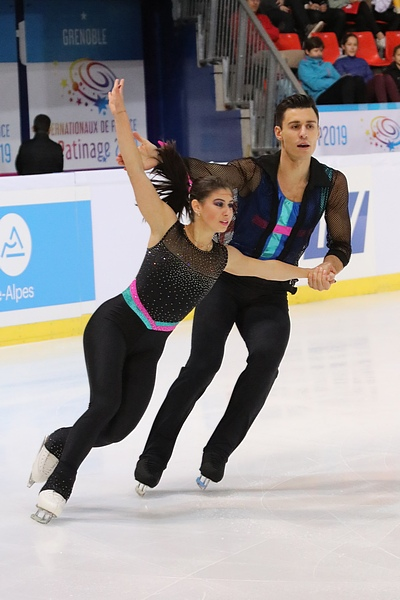
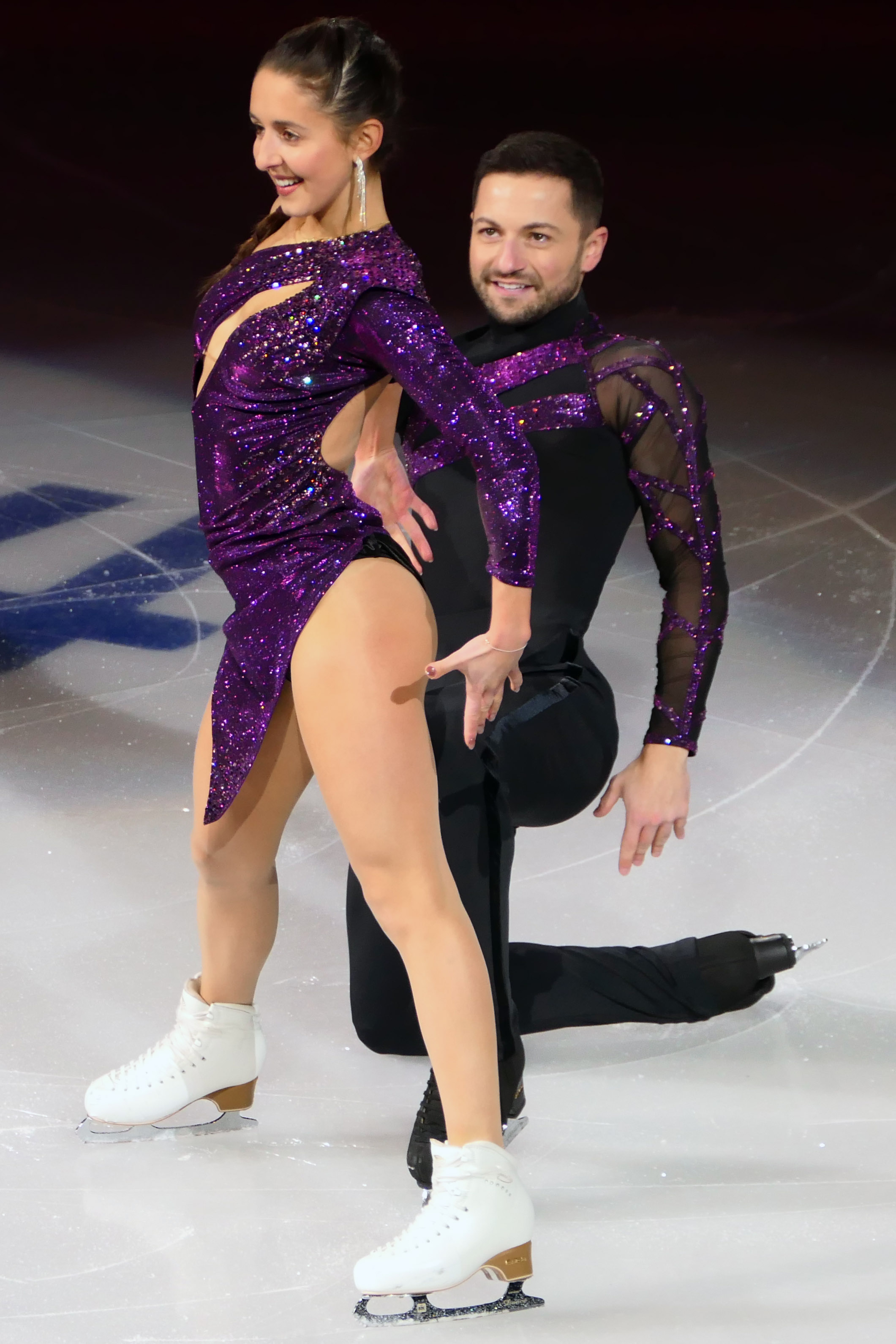
The 2022 U.S. International Classic champions (from left to right):
Ilia Malinin of the United States (men's singles); Kim Ye-lim of South Korea (women's singles); Rebecca Ghilardi and Filippo Ambrosini of Italy (pair skating); and Lilah Fear and Lewis Gibson of Great Britain (ice dance)

Medalists
Discipline	Gold	Silver	Bronze
Men	(United States); Ilia Malinin	(France); Kévin Aymoz	(United States); Camden Pulkinen
Women	(South Korea); Kim Ye-lim	(South Korea); You Young	(Japan); Mana Kawabe
Pairs	(Italy); Rebecca Ghilardi; Filippo Ambrosini	(United States); Emily Chan; Spencer Howe	(United States); Valentina Plazas; Maximiliano Fernandez
Ice dance	(United Kingdom); Lilah Fear; Lewis Gibson	(United States); Eva Pate; Logan Bye	(United States); Lorraine McNamara; Anton Spiridonov

== Results ==
=== Men's singles ===
The men's short program was held on September 13, while the free skate was held on September 14. Ilia Malinin of the United States had a difficult start, finishing sixth in the short program after falling on his first two jumps. However, he rebounded in the free skate and also successfully performed the very first quadruple Axel in competition. Malinin's free skate included three other quadruple jumps and a difficult triple Lutz-triple Axel jump sequence. While skaters in the past, including Nathan Chen and Yuzuru Hanyu, had attempted the quadruple Axel, Malinin was the first to successfully land one with four-and-a-half full rotations in the air. The arena was mostly empty, but news of Malinin's accomplishment spread quickly. Adam Rippon, retired American skater and Olympic bronze medalist, wrote on social media: "This is the craziest thing I've ever seen anyone do on the ice."

Kévin Aymoz of France finished in second place, while Camden Pulkinen of the United States finished in third. Daniel Grassl of Italy withdrew from the competition after a painful collision with the boards during his free skate.

Men's results
Rank	Skater	Nation	Total	SP		FS	
1st place, gold medalist(s)	Ilia Malinin	United States	257.28	6	71.84	1	185.44
2nd place, silver medalist(s)	Kévin Aymoz	France	236.17	1	83.52	2	152.65
3rd place, bronze medalist(s)	Camden Pulkinen	United States	219.49	3	77.44	4	142.05
4	Mark Gorodnitsky	Israel	218.83	2	77.65	5	141.18
5	Jimmy Ma	United States	216.76	8	69.88	3	146.88
6	Stephen Gogolev	Canada	208.43	5	72.89	6	135.54
7	Arlet Levandi	Estonia	202.29	7	70.02	7	132.27
8	Donovan Carrillo	Mexico	181.44	9	68.10	10	113.34
9	Eric Sjoberg	United States	179.09	11	47.49	8	131.60
10	Wesley Chiu	Canada	171.69	10	55.14	9	116.55
WD	Daniel Grassl	Italy	Withdrew	4	73.69	Withdrew from competition	

=== Women's singles ===
The women's short program was held on September 14, while the free skate was held on September 15. Kim Ye-lim and You Young, both of South Korea, won the gold and silver medals, respectively. Although Kim finished fifth after the short program, she rallied back in the free skate to win the gold medal. You cited Yuna Kim – the South Korean skater who won the gold medal at the 2010 Winter Olympics – as an inspiration for a whole new generation of young skaters in South Korea. Both Kim and You competed at the 2022 Winter Olympics; You finished sixth, while Kim finished ninth. (Note: After Kamila Valieva's results from the 2022 Winter Olympics were invalidated by the Court of Arbitration for Sport on December 25, 2021, You and Kim's placements were raised to fifth and eighth, respectively.) Mana Kawabe of Japan won the bronze medal.

Women's results
Rank	Skater	Nation	Total	SP		FS	
1st place, gold medalist(s)	Kim Ye-lim	South Korea	190.64	5	58.32	1	132.32
2nd place, silver medalist(s)	You Young	South Korea	183.40	1	63.19	2	120.21
3rd place, bronze medalist(s)	Mana Kawabe	Japan	180.11	2	62.68	3	117.43
4	Audrey Shin	United States	176.44	3	61.16	5	115.28
5	Sonja Hilmer	United States	174.76	6	57.93	4	116.53
6	Jocelyn Hong	New Zealand	162.54	4	60.76	6	101.78
7	Jill Heiner	United States	142.53	9	47.41	7	95.12
8	Alessia Tornaghi	Italy	133.48	8	49.06	9	84.42
9	Marilena Kitromilis	Cyprus	129.64	7	52.55	11	77.09
10	Eliška Březinová	Czech Republic	129.15	10	43.03	8	86.12
11	Sofia Lexi Jacqueline Frank	Philippines	115.89	13	37.62	10	78.27
12	Victoria Alcantara	Australia	108.84	11	41.25	12	67.59
13	Andrea Montesinos Cantú	Mexico	103.29	12	39.86	13	63.43

=== Pairs ===
The pairs' short program was held on September 13, while the free skate was held on September 14. Rebecca Ghilardi and Filippo Ambrosini of Italy, who had won the 2022 John Nicks Pairs Challenge just days earlier, finished first in both the short program and the free skate, guaranteeing their gold medal win. Their total score of 189.22 was also a new personal best. Emily Chan and Spencer Howe of the United States won the silver, while Valentina Plazas and Maximiliano Fernandez, also of the United States, won the bronze. The gold, silver, and bronze medal results were identical to those at the 2022 John Nicks Pairs Challenge. Chan and Howe performed a difficult double Salchow-double Axel-double Axel jump sequence in their free skate, and also scored a new personal best score. This was only the second international competition ever for Plazas and Fernandez, the first being the John Nicks Pairs Challenge, and was also their second bronze medal win.

Pairs' results
Rank	Team	Nation	Total	SP		FS	
1st place, gold medalist(s)	Rebecca Ghilardi; Filippo Ambrosini	Italy	189.22	1	64.78	1	124.44
2nd place, silver medalist(s)	Emily Chan; Spencer Howe	United States	181.81	2	61.71	2	120.10
3rd place, bronze medalist(s)	Valentina Plazas; Maximiliano Fernandez	United States	166.25	3	56.20	3	110.05
4	Maria Mokhova; Ivan Mokhov	United States	161.29	4	54.65	4	106.64
5	Kelly Ann Laurin; Loucas Éthier	Canada	150.81	5	50.48	5	100.33
6	Megan Wessenberg; Blake Eisenach	United States	138.22	6	46.94	6	91.28
7	Lori-Ann Matte; Thierry Ferland	Canada	132.15	7	46.13	7	86.02

=== Ice dance ===
The rhythm dance was held on September 14, while the free dance was held on September 15. Lilah Fear and Lewis Gibson of Great Britain won the gold medals after finishing first in both the rhythm dance and free dance. Fear and Gibson cited Jayne Torvill and Christopher Dean – 1984 Olympic gold medalists in ice dance – as a source of inspiration. "Torvill and Dean created the legacy of ice dance in Great Britain," Fear stated in an interview. "The pride we have for ice dance in Great Britain, and for us, we are so inspired by them as people, but also their creativity." Their rhythm dance featured music by Jennifer Lopez, with Fear wearing a dress similar to the one Lopez wore to the 42nd Grammy Awards, while their free dance featured a medley of music by Lady Gaga.

Eva Pate and Logan Bye of the United States finished in second place, while Lorraine McNamara and Anton Spiridonov, also of the United States, finished in third. Pate and Bye performed to music from Riverdance for their free dance, which they chose as a nod to Pate's Irish heritage. McNamara and Spiridonov had a small error with one of their lifts in the free dance, but they were still able to secure the bronze medals.

Ice dance results
Rank	Team	Nation	Total	RD		FD	
1st place, gold medalist(s)	Lilah Fear; Lewis Gibson	Great Britain	190.80	1	77.22	1	113.58
2nd place, silver medalist(s)	Eva Pate; Logan Bye	United States	179.63	3	72.66	2	106.97
3rd place, bronze medalist(s)	Lorraine McNamara; Anton Spiridonov	United States	179.03	2	73.17	4	105.86
4	Marie-Jade Lauriault; Romain Le Gac	Canada	175.67	4	69.72	3	106.95
5	Haley Sales; Nikolas Wamsteeker	Canada	170.11	5	66.04	5	104.07
6	Katarina Wolfkostin; Jeffrey Chen	United States	164.07	6	60.69	6	103.38
7	Misato Komatsubara; Tim Koleto	Japan	155.94	7	60.38	7	95.56
8	Mariia Nosovitskaya; Mikhail Nosovitskiy	Israel	154.29	8	59.44	8	94.85
9	Leia Dozzi; Pietro Papetti	Italy	149.39	10	57.76	9	91.63
10	Olivia Oliver; Elliott Graham	Poland	148.19	9	58.33	10	89.86
11	Charlotte Lafond-Fournier; Richard Kam	New Zealand	139.41	11	57.67	11	81.74
12	Samantha Ritter; Daniel Brykalov	Azerbaijan	131.10	12	54.63	12	76.47

== Works cited ==
- "Special Regulations & Technical Rules – Single & Pair Skating and Ice Dance 2021". International Skating Union. Archived from the original on April 4, 2022.
