= 2022 Skate Canada International =

- Type: Grand Prix
- Date: October 28 – 30
- Season: 2022–23
- Location: Mississauga, Ontario, Canada
- Host: Skate Canada
- Venue: Paramount Fine Foods Centre

Champions
- Men's singles: (Japan) Shoma Uno
- Women's singles: (Japan) Rinka Watanabe
- Pairs: (Japan) Riku Miura / Ryuichi Kihara
- Ice dance: (Canada) Piper Gilles / Paul Poirier
- Previous: 2021 Skate Canada International
- Next: 2023 Skate Canada International
- Previous Grand Prix: 2022 Skate America
- Next Grand Prix: 2022 Grand Prix de France

The 2022 Skate Canada International was the second event of the 2022–23 ISU Grand Prix of Figure Skating: a senior-level international invitational competition series. It was held at the Paramount Fine Foods Centre in Mississauga, Ontario, from October 28–30. Medals were awarded in men's singles, women's singles, pair skating, and ice dance. Skaters also earned points toward qualifying for the 2022–23 Grand Prix Final.

== Entries ==
The International Skating Union announced the preliminary assignments on July 22, 2022.

| Country | Men | Women | Pairs | Ice dance |
|---|---|---|---|---|
| Australia | | | | Holly Harris / Jason Chan |
| Canada | Stephen Gogolev; Keegan Messing; Conrad Orzel | Gabrielle Daleman; Madeline Schizas | Kelly Ann Laurin / Loucas Ethier; Brooke McIntosh / Benjamin Mimar | Piper Gilles / Paul Poirier; Marjorie Lajoie / Zachary Lagha; Marie-Jade Lauriault / Romain Le Gac |
| Czech Republic | | Eliška Březinová | Jelizaveta Žuková / Martin Bidař | |
| Estonia | Aleksandr Selevko | Niina Petrõkina | | |
| Germany | | | Alisa Efimova / Ruben Blommaert | |
| Great Britain | | | | Lilah Fear / Lewis Gibson |
| Israel | | | | Mariia Nosovitskaya / Mikhail Nosovitskiy |
| Italy | Matteo Rizzo | | Sara Conti / Niccolò Macii | |
| Japan | Kao Miura; Shoma Uno | Rika Kihira; Rinka Watanabe; Yuhana Yokoi | Riku Miura / Ryuichi Kihara | Misato Komatsubara / Tim Koleto |
| Latvia | Deniss Vasiļjevs | | | |
| Netherlands | | Lindsay van Zundert | | |
| South Korea | | You Young | | |
| Switzerland | Lukas Britschgi | | | |
| United States | Jimmy Ma; Camden Pulkinen | Starr Andrews; Lindsay Thorngren; Ava Marie Ziegler | Emily Chan / Spencer Akira Howe; Valentina Plazas / Maximiliano Fernandez | Emily Bratti / Ian Somerville; Molly Cesanek / Yehor Yehorov; Caroline Green / Michael Parsons |

== Changes to preliminary assignments ==
| Discipline | Withdrew | | Added | | Notes | Ref. |
| Discipline | Date | Skater(s) | Date | Skater(s) | Notes | Ref. |
|---|---|---|---|---|---|---|
| Pairs | August 5 | (Canada) Evelyn Walsh / Trennt Michaud | October 3 | (Germany) Alisa Efimova / Ruben Blommaert | Walsh retired. | |
| Women | August 23 | (South Korea) Lim Eun-soo | August 30 | (Belgium) Nina Pinzarrone | | |
| Women | August 31 | (Azerbaijan) Ekaterina Ryabova | September 1 | (United States) Starr Andrews | Ryabova retired. | |
| Women | September 6 | (Belgium) Nina Pinzarrone | September 14 | (Netherlands) Lindsay van Zundert | Injury | |
| Pairs | — | | September 16 | (Canada) Kelly Ann Laurin / Loucas Éthier | Host picks | |
| Women | September 29 | (Canada) Alison Schumacher | September 30 | (United States) Kate Wang | | |
| Women | October 5 | (Japan) Wakaba Higuchi | October 11 | (Japan) Rinka Watanabe | Injury | |
| Pairs | October 18 | (United States) Katie McBeath / Nathan Bartholomay | October 20 | (United States) Valentina Plazas / Maximiliano Fernandez | | |
| Women | October 24 | (United States) Kate Wang | October 24 | (United States) Ava Marie Ziegler | | |
| Ice dance | October 24 | (Canada) Miku Makita / Tyler Gunara | October 24 | (Canada) Marie-Jade Lauriault / Romain Le Gac | Injury | |
| Men | October 27 | (China) Jin Boyang | — | | Recovery from surgery | |

== Results ==
=== Men's singles ===
| Rank | Skater | Nation | Total points | SP | | FS | |
|---|---|---|---|---|---|---|---|
| 1st place, gold medalist(s) | Shoma Uno | Japan | 273.15 | 2 | 89.98 | 1 | 183.17 |
| 2nd place, silver medalist(s) | Kao Miura | Japan | 265.29 | 1 | 94.06 | 2 | 171.23 |
| 3rd place, bronze medalist(s) | Matteo Rizzo | Italy | 251.03 | 3 | 81.18 | 4 | 169.85 |
| 4 | Keegan Messing | Canada | 250.72 | 4 | 79.69 | 3 | 171.03 |
| 5 | Camden Pulkinen | United States | 219.06 | 5 | 75.07 | 8 | 143.99 |
| 6 | Lukas Britschgi | Switzerland | 212.43 | 8 | 64.35 | 6 | 148.08 |
| 7 | Stephen Gogolev | Canada | 210.64 | 11 | 57.94 | 5 | 152.70 |
| 8 | Aleksandr Selevko | Estonia | 206.11 | 10 | 60.37 | 7 | 145.74 |
| 9 | Jimmy Ma | United States | 204.39 | 9 | 61.73 | 9 | 142.66 |
| 10 | Deniss Vasiļjevs | Latvia | 197.45 | 7 | 69.01 | 10 | 128.44 |
| 11 | Conrad Orzel | Canada | 195.42 | 6 | 69.69 | 11 | 125.73 |

=== Women's singles ===
| Rank | Skater | Nation | Total points | SP | | FS | |
|---|---|---|---|---|---|---|---|
| 1st place, gold medalist(s) | Rinka Watanabe | Japan | 197.59 | 6 | 63.27 | 1 | 134.32 |
| 2nd place, silver medalist(s) | Starr Andrews | United States | 191.26 | 5 | 64.69 | 2 | 126.57 |
| 3rd place, bronze medalist(s) | You Young | South Korea | 190.15 | 4 | 65.10 | 4 | 125.05 |
| 4 | Ava Marie Ziegler | United States | 186.76 | 3 | 66.49 | 7 | 120.27 |
| 5 | Rika Kihira | Japan | 184.33 | 8 | 59.27 | 3 | 125.06 |
| 6 | Niina Petrõkina | Estonia | 181.34 | 7 | 61.68 | 8 | 119.66 |
| 7 | Madeline Schizas | Canada | 180.59 | 1 | 67.90 | 9 | 112.69 |
| 8 | Yuhana Yokoi | Japan | 178.73 | 12 | 54.87 | 5 | 123.86 |
| 9 | Lindsay Thorngren | United States | 176.09 | 10 | 55.16 | 6 | 120.93 |
| 10 | Gabrielle Daleman | Canada | 171.61 | 2 | 66.65 | 11 | 104.96 |
| 11 | Lindsay van Zundert | Netherlands | 160.96 | 9 | 55.22 | 10 | 105.74 |
| 12 | Eliška Březinová | Czech Republic | 159.03 | 11 | 55.14 | 12 | 103.89 |

=== Pairs ===
| Rank | Team | Nation | Total points | SP | | FS | |
|---|---|---|---|---|---|---|---|
| 1st place, gold medalist(s) | Riku Miura / Ryuichi Kihara | Japan | 212.02 | 1 | 73.39 | 1 | 138.63 |
| 2nd place, silver medalist(s) | Emily Chan / Spencer Akira Howe | United States | 186.48 | 2 | 67.39 | 3 | 119.09 |
| 3rd place, bronze medalist(s) | Sara Conti / Niccolò Macii | Italy | 186.18 | 3 | 66.66 | 2 | 119.52 |
| 4 | Brooke McIntosh / Benjamin Mimar | Canada | 175.49 | 4 | 60.82 | 4 | 114.67 |
| 5 | Valentina Plazas / Maximiliano Fernandez | United States | 164.14 | 5 | 55.70 | 5 | 108.44 |
| 6 | Jelizaveta Žuková / Martin Bidař | Czech Republic | 153.50 | 6 | 52.84 | 7 | 100.66 |
| 7 | Kelly Ann Laurin / Loucas Éthier | Canada | 152.09 | 8 | 50.84 | 6 | 101.25 |
| WD | Alisa Efimova / Ruben Blommaert | Germany | withdrew | 7 | 51.49 | withdrew from competition | |

=== Ice dance ===
| Rank | Team | Nation | Total points | RD | | FD | |
|---|---|---|---|---|---|---|---|
| 1st place, gold medalist(s) | Piper Gilles / Paul Poirier | Canada | 215.70 | 1 | 87.23 | 1 | 128.47 |
| 2nd place, silver medalist(s) | Lilah Fear / Lewis Gibson | Great Britain | 209.18 | 2 | 83.80 | 2 | 125.38 |
| 3rd place, bronze medalist(s) | Marjorie Lajoie / Zachary Lagha | Canada | 195.49 | 4 | 75.94 | 3 | 119.55 |
| 4 | Caroline Green / Michael Parsons | United States | 194.19 | 3 | 76.13 | 4 | 118.06 |
| 5 | Marie-Jade Lauriault / Romain Le Gac | Canada | 189.07 | 5 | 74.59 | 5 | 114.48 |
| 6 | Emily Bratti / Ian Somerville | United States | 179.14 | 6 | 70.85 | 6 | 108.29 |
| 7 | Misato Komatsubara / Tim Koleto | Japan | 166.06 | 7 | 68.88 | 7 | 97.18 |
| 8 | Holly Harris / Jason Chan | Australia | 159.92 | 8 | 67.68 | 8 | 92.24 |
| 9 | Molly Cesanek / Yehor Yehorov | United States | 150.79 | 9 | 61.40 | 9 | 89.39 |
| 10 | Mariia Nosovitskaya / Mikhail Nosovitskiy | Israel | 146.49 | 10 | 58.03 | 10 | 88.46 |
