= James Peterson (figure skater) =

American figure skater

Jim Peterson
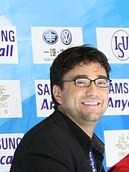
- Jim Peterson at the Cup of China 2010.

Personal information
- Full name: Jim Peterson
- Born: Seattle, Washington, U.S.
- Height: 6’2”

Figure skating career
- Country: United States
- Skating club: Arctic FSC

James Peterson is an American World and Olympic figure skating coach.

Peterson began coaching in 2001 and coaches in Florida. He was the 2009 and 2010 Professional Skaters Association Developmental Coach of the Year making him one of the few coaches to win the award consecutively. He also has won the USOCm Developmental Coach of the year award in 2009. His former students include 2010 Olympians Caydee Denney & Jeremy Barrett, Amanda Evora & Mark Ladwig and 2007 U.S. Novice and 2009 U.S. Junior National Champions Tracy Tanovich and Michael Chau. Peterson's students Denney/Barrett and Evora/Ladwig made up the entire US Olympic pair team contingency at the Vancouver Games.

Peterson also coached Felicia Zhang and Nathan Bartholomay who qualified and competed at the 2014 Sochi Olympics by winning the silver at the U.S Nationals to earn their Olympic spot. In 2016 Peterson coached National Champions Tarah Kayne and Danny O'Shea, Junior title winners Joy Weinberg and Max Fernandez and National Novice champions Jonah Barret and Eli Kopmar completing a coaching “hat trick” that year.

In 2020 Peterson and coaching partner Amanda Evora-Will moved to Michigan and currently coach at the Arctic edge training center which also houses the MIDA dance program. Peterson and Evora/Will work with a variety of pair teams, including Valentina Plazas and Maximiliano Fernandez, 2024 National bronze medalists and World Championship competitors.
