= Anton Spiridonov =

Russian-American ice dancer

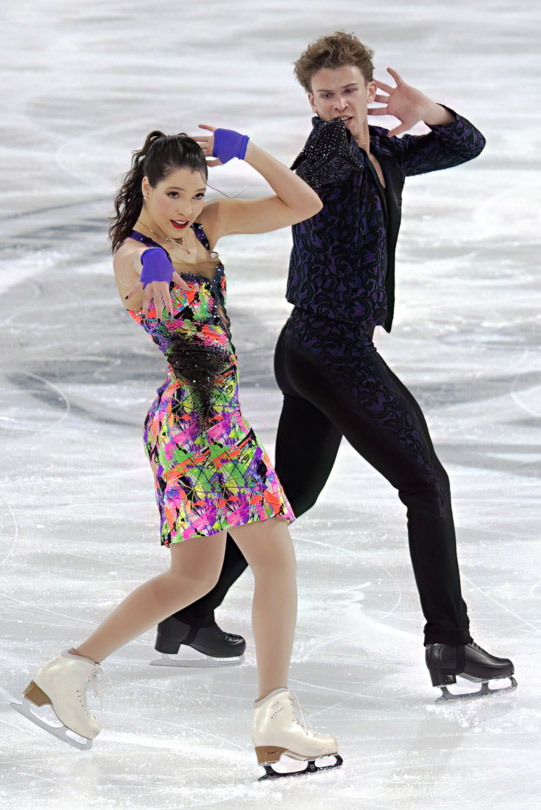
- Spiridonov and McNamara at the 2023 Grand Prix de France

Personal information
- Native name: Антон Валерьевич Спиридонов
- Full name: Anton Valeryevich Spiridonov
- Born: August 5, 1998 (age 28)
- Home town: Kissimmee, Florida, U.S.
- Height: 5 ft 10 in (1.79 m)

Figure skating career
- Country: United States (since 2020); Russia (2018–19); Great Britain (2016–17); Russia (2014–15)
- Discipline: Ice dance
- Partner: Vanessa Pham (since 2024); Lorraine McNamara (2020–23)
- Coach: Marie-France Dubreuil; Patrice Lauzon; Romain Haguenauer
- Skating club: The Skating Club of New York
- Began skating: 2009

Anton Valeryevich Spiridonov (born August 5, 1998) is a Russian-American ice dancer. With his former skating partner, Lorraine McNamara, he is the 2023 World University Games silver medalist and 2022 CS U.S. Classic bronze medalist.

== Personal life ==
Spiridonov was born on August 5, 1998, in Kissimmee, Florida to parents Valery Spiridonov, a former pair skater, and Elena Garanina, a former ice dancer, both for the Soviet Union. His half-brother, Maxim Zavosin, formerly competed in ice dance for the United States and Hungary.

== Programs ==
=== With Pham ===
Season	Rhythm dance	Free dance
2025–2026	Come as You Are; Smells Like Teen Spirit by Nirvana; Smells Like Teen Spirit by Coopex, CPX, & Nito-Onna choreo. by Marie-France Dubreuil	Ghost; Overture by Dave Stewart, Glen Ballard, & Christopher Nightingale; Sam's Murder by Christopher Nightingale performed by Richard Fleeshman & Caissie Levy; With You by Christopher Nightingale performed by Caissie Levy; Life Turns on a Dime by Christopher Nightingale performed by Bryce Pinkham, Richard Fleeshman, & Caissie Levy; Unchained Melody (Dance) / The Love Inside by Todd Duncan performed by Christopher Nightingale, Richard Fleeshman, & Caissie Levy choreo. by Marie-France Dubreuil
2024–2025	Do You Love Me by The Contours & Berry Gordy; Cry to Me by Solomon Burke & Bert Berns; Wipe Out by The Surfaris choreo. by Marie-France Dubreuil	Carmen; Cello Impromptu in F Minor by Nicholas Britell & Caitlin Sullivan; Tú y Yo by Nicholas Britell & Melissa Barrera; Waltz Tango by Nicholas Britell & Tim Fain; Lullaby / Beyond – Vive La Musique by Nicholas Britell, Melissa Barrera, & Paul Mescal choreo. by Marie-France Dubreuil

=== With McNamara ===
Season	Rhythm dance	Free dance	Exhibition
2023–2024	Kiss; Slow Love; Let's Go Crazy by Prince choreo. by Elena Novak, Jimmie Manners	Chalkboard; A Deal With Chaos; Camping by Jóhann Jóhannsson; Run by Ludovico Einaudi choreo. by Elena Novak, Jimmie Manners	
2022–2023	Rhumba: Careless Whisper by George Michael arr. by Hugo Chouinard choreo. by Elena Novak, Jimmie Manners	Rain, In Your Black Eyes by Ezio Bosso choreo. by Elena Novak, Jimmie Manners	Hot in Herre by Nelly; Hey Ya! by Outkast
2021–2022	Hip Hop: Hot in Herre by Nelly; Blues: No Diggity by Blackstreet; Hip Hop: Hey Ya! by Outkast choreo. by Jimmie Manners, Alexei Kiliakov, Elena Novak	The Phantom of the Opera by Andrew Lloyd Webber choreo. by Jimmie Manners, Alexei Kiliakov, Elena Novak	
2020–2021	Quickstep: Big Spender; Swing: Rich Man's Frug (from Sweet Charity) by Cy Coleman choreo. by Meredith Jones, Elena Novak	Money; Shine On You Crazy Diamond by Pink Floyd choreo. by Meredith Jones, Elena Novak	

=== With Pankova ===
Season	Rhythm dance	Free dance
2018–2019	Santa Maria (Del Buen Ayre) by Gotan Project; Assassin's Tango (from Mr. & Mrs. Smith) by John Powell	Windmills of Your Mind; (Where Do I Begin?) Love Story; Summer of '42 performed by Henry Mancini

=== With Marsh ===
Season	Rhythm dance	Free dance
2016–2017	Blues: Seven Nation Army by The White Stripes performed by Postmodern Jukebox; Hip Hop: Hush Hush by The Pussycat Dolls	Les Temps de Cathedrales; Le Val d'Amour; Danse Mon Esmeralda (from Notre-Dame de Paris) by Riccardo Cocciante and Luc Plamondon

== Competitive highlights ==
- GP – Event of the ISU Grand Prix Series
- JGP – Event of the ISU Junior Grand Prix Series
- CS – Event of the ISU Challenger Series
- TBD – Assigned
- WD – Withdrew from competition

=== Ice dance with Vanessa Pham (for the United States) ===
Competition placements at senior level
Season	2024–25	2025–26	2026–27
U.S. Championships	12th	15th	
Bavarian Open		4th	
Bolero Cup			6th
Ice Challenge	4th		
Lake Placid Ice Dance		8th	6th
Mezzaluna Cup		9th	

=== Ice dance with Lorraine McNamara (for the United States) ===
Competition placements at senior level
Season	2020–21	2021–22	2022–23	2023–24
GP France				9th
GP NHK Trophy				8th
GP Skate America	6th		7th	
CS Cup of Austria		10th		
CS Nebelhorn Trophy			5th	8th
CS U.S. Classic		5th	3rd	
Lake Placid Ice Dance		7th	1st	4th
Santa Claus Cup			3rd	
World University Games			2nd	
U.S. Championships	6th	9th	6th	

=== Ice dance with Polina Pankova (for Russia) ===
Competition placements at junior level
Season	2018–19
Ice Star	4th
Mentor Cup	5th
Open d'Andorra	1st
Russian Championships	12th

=== Ice dance with Leticia Marsh (for Great Britain) ===
Competition placements at junior level
Season	2016–17
JGP Germany	9th
JGP Slovenia	8th
Lake Placid Ice Dance	9th

=== Ice dance with Jana Buga (for Russia) ===
Competition placements at junior level
Season	2014–15
Ice Star	13th

== Detailed results ==
=== Ice dance with Vanessa Pham (for the United States) ===
Results in the 2024–25 season
Date	Event	RD		FD		Total	
Date	Event	P	Score	P	Score	P	Score
Nov 5–10, 2024	(Austria) 2024 Ice Challenge	4	65.87	6	97.85	4	163.72
Jan 20–26, 2025	(United States) 2025 U.S. Championships	12	64.00	12	102.39	12	166.39

Results in the 2025–26 season
Date	Event	RD		FD		Total	
Date	Event	P	Score	P	Score	P	Score
Jul 29–31, 2025	(United States) 2025 Lake Placid Ice Dance International	8	63.34	7	97.96	8	161.30
Oct 15–19, 2025	(Italy) 2025 Mezzaluna Cup	9	61.18	8	93.29	9	154.47
Jan 4–11, 2026	(United States) 2026 U.S. Championships	15	61.41	13	97.21	15	158.62
Jan 27 – Feb 1, 2026	(Germany) 2026 Bavarian Open	4	65.63	4	99.33	4	164.96

Results in the 2026–27 season
Date	Event	RD		FD		Total	
Date	Event	P	Score	P	Score	P	Score
Jul 28–30, 2026	(United States) 2026 Lake Placid Ice Dance International	6	57.97	6	83.76	6	141.73
Sep 3–4, 2026	(United Kingdom) 2026 Bolero Cup	5	60.06	5	93.65	6	153.71
