= Amanda Evora =

American pair skater

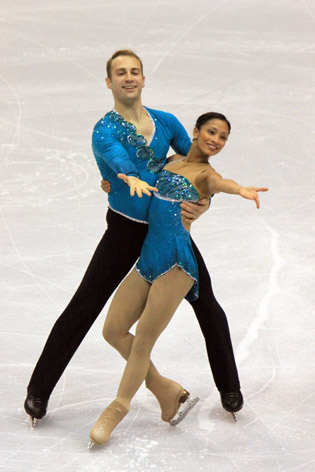
- Evora & Ladwig in 2009.

Personal information
- Full name: Amanda Evora Will
- Born: November 17, 1984 (age 41) New York City, U.S.
- Height: 5 ft 0 in (152 cm)

Figure skating career
- Country: United States
- Skating club: Southwest Florida FSC
- Began skating: 1990
- Retired: April 10, 2012

Amanda Evora (born November 17, 1984) is an American former competitive pair skater. She competed with Mark Ladwig. They are two-time (2010, 2011) U.S. silver medalists, 2012 U.S. bronze medalists and two-time (2007, 2009) U.S. pewter medalists.

== Personal life ==
Evora was born in New York City. Her family moved to Houston in 1995. Before that, they had lived in Bahrain, Dallas, Texas, and Virginia. She is Filipino American. Her father is a chemical engineer. Evora graduated from the State College of Florida, Manatee–Sarasota and earned a degree in business administration from the University of South Florida. Amanda married Dustin Will on December 28, 2019.

== Career ==
Evora began skating after she discovered her sister's ice skates and, since they fit, decided to give them a try. When she was 18, she left her family's home in Texas to further her skating career.

Early in her pairs career, Evora skated with Michael Adler. They won the bronze medal at the 2002 Eastern Sectional Championships on the junior level and placed 8th on the junior level at the 2002 United States Figure Skating Championships.

Evora and Ladwig teamed up in 2002. The 2005/2006 season was their first on the Grand Prix. They placed 9th at the 2005 Skate America and 8th at the 2005 Skate Canada International. They were the bronze medalists at the 2007 Nebelhorn Trophy and finished as high as fourth in GP events.

2009–10 was a breakthrough season for Evora and Ladwig. They finished 2nd at the US National Championships, their best finish yet at the event, which led to their selection for the US Olympic team. At the 2010 Vancouver Olympics, they beat their previous personal best by a sizable margin, and finished tenth, making them the top US pair at the Olympics. They later competed at 2010 Worlds for the first time in their career, and finished in ninth place.

Evora served on the 2008–09 Athletes Advisory Committee.

During 2010–2011 season, the pair was assigned to compete at 2010 Cup of China where they finished fifth (151.66 pts) and later earned their first Grand Prix medal, a bronze, at 2010 Cup of Russia, with a season's best of 110.27 and total score of 162.85.

Evora and Ladwig were noted for their longevity as a pair, which is rare in U.S. pair skating. Their partnership ended when Evora retired from competitive skating on April 10, 2012.

In June 2012, Evora was invited by United States Secretary of State Hillary Clinton to attend a luncheon in honor of Benigno S. Aquino III, the President of the Philippines.

In January 2016, Evora returned to the U.S. Nationals as part of the coaching team for Tarah Kayne and Daniel O'Shea who won the gold medal in the pairs competition.

In 2013, Evora teamed up with Scott Thornton in the Canadian TV show "Battle of the Blades." The duo then went on to win the competition. As of September 2019, Evora has returned to the show and partnered up with Colton Orr.

== Programs ==
(with Ladwig)

Season	Short program	Free skating	Exhibition
2011–2012	The Man I Love by George Gershwin	Daphnis et Chloé by Maurice Ravel; Reverie by Claude Debussy	
2010–2011	The Mask of Zorro by James Horner	Nessun Dorma by Giacomo Puccini	
2009–2010	Portuguese Love Theme (from Love Actually) by Craig Armstrong	Piano Concerto No. 2 in C Minor by Sergei Rachmaninoff	
2008–2009	Santorini by Yanni	Pas De Deux (from The Nutcracker) by Pyotr Ilyich Tchaikovsky	Your Song (from Moulin Rouge!) performed by Ewan McGregor
2007–2008	Stray Cat Strut by the Stray Cats and Brian Setzer	Daphnis et Chloé by Maurice Ravel; Reverie by Claude Debussy	
2006–2007	Black Magic Woman by Santana	West Side Story	
2005–2006	Hotel California by the Eagles	Romeo and Juliet by Sergei Prokofiev	
2004–2005	Theme for the Common Man by Aaron Copland	Butterfly Suite by Vanessa-Mae	
2003–2004	Smokie Joe's Cafe	Scheherazade by Nikolai Rimsky-Korsakov	

== Competitive highlights ==
=== With Ladwig ===
Results
International
Event	2002–03	2003–04	2004–05	2005–06	2006–07	2007–08	2008–09	2009–10	2010–11	2011–12
Olympics								10th		
Worlds								9th	11th	
Four Continents			5th						6th	6th
GP Bompard										4th
GP Cup of China							4th	7th	5th	4th
GP Cup of Russia									3rd	
GP Skate America				9th		4th		5th		
GP Skate Canada				8th			7th			
Nebelhorn			5th			3rd				
Golden Spin		1st								
National
U.S. Champ.	12th	10th	5th	7th	4th	5th	4th	2nd	2nd	3rd

=== With Adler ===
Event	2001–2002
U.S. Championships	8th J.
