= Jimmy Ma =

American figure skater (born 1995)

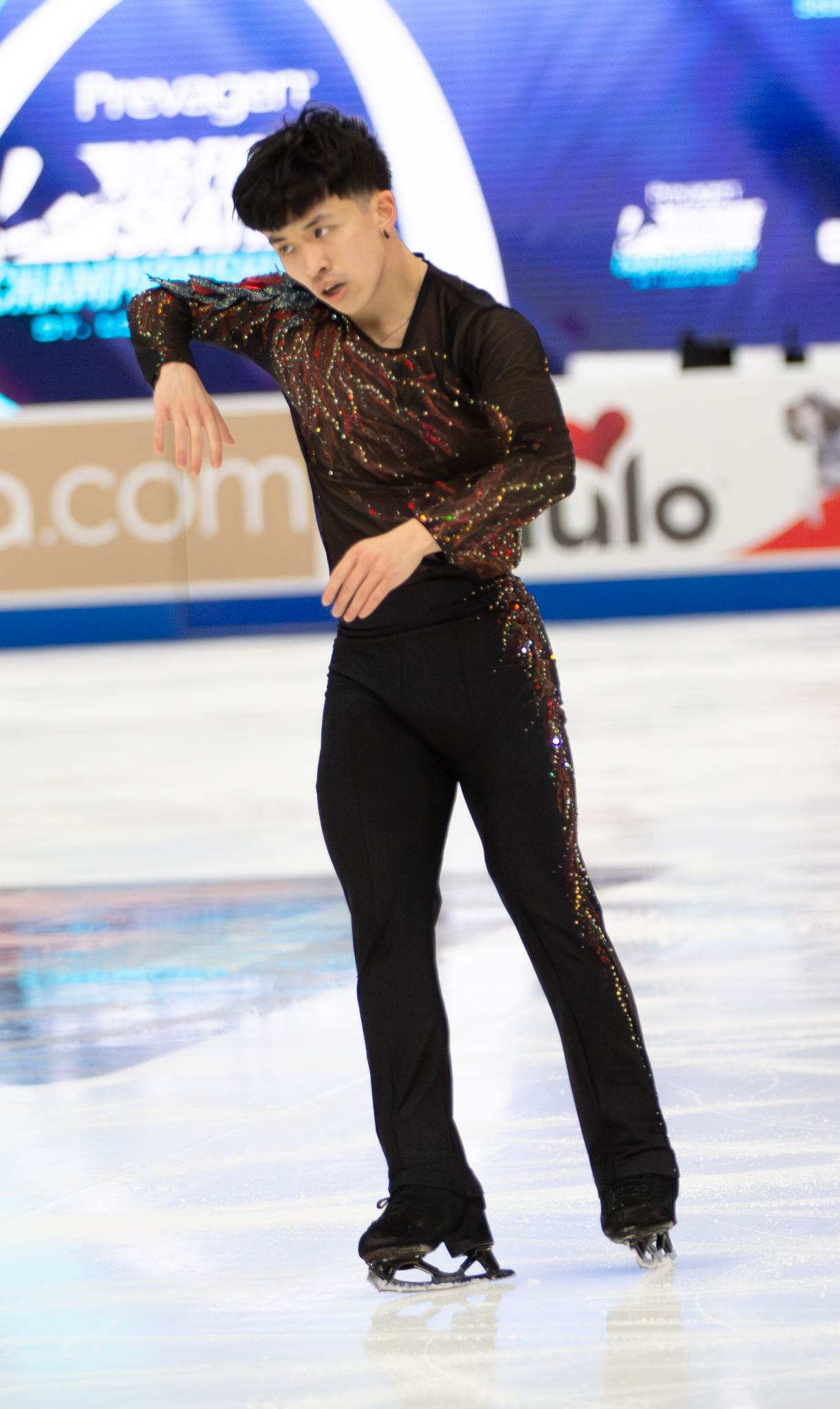
- Ma during his short program at the 2026 U.S. Championships

Personal information
- Born: October 11, 1995 (age 31) Queens, New York, U.S.
- Home town: Great Neck, New York, U.S.
- Height: 5 ft 5 in (1.64 m)

Figure skating career
- Country: United States
- Discipline: Men's singles
- Coach: Alexei Letov; Olga Ganicheva
- Skating club: Skating Club of Boston
- Began skating: 2004

Medal record
Four Continents Championships
Bronze medal – third place	2025 Seoul	Singles

Jimmy Ma (born October 11, 1995) is an American figure skater. He is the 2025 Four Continents bronze medalist and a three-time ISU Challenger Series bronze medalist. Ma has competed in twelve senior U.S. national championships, achieving his highest result, fifth, in 2023 and 2025.

At the junior level, Ma is a two-time U.S. junior national medalist (bronze in 2014, pewter in 2013)

== Skating career ==
=== Early career ===
Ma began learning to skate in 2004. He grew up in Great Neck where he skated at Parkwood Sports Complex and Chelsea Piers. He made his ISU Junior Grand Prix debut in August 2013, placing 13th in Riga, Latvia. Elaine Zayak, Steven Rice and Hongyun Liu coached him in Hackensack, New Jersey.

=== 2017–2018 season ===
Ma placed eleventh at the 2018 U.S. Championships.

=== 2018–2019 season: Senior international debut ===
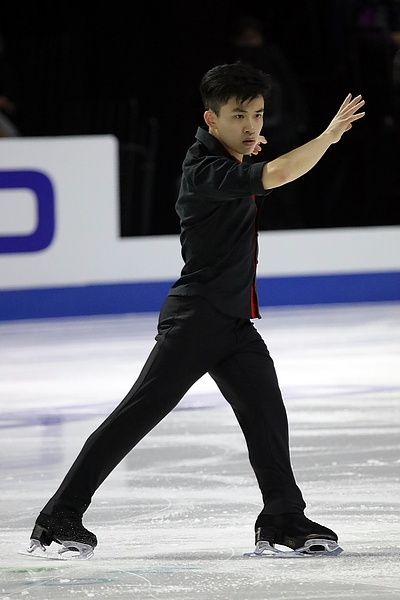
Ma at 2018 Skate America

As of the 2018–2019 season, Ma is coached by Darlene Cain and Peter Cain in Euless, Texas and by Nikolai Morozov in Hackensack, New Jersey. He began his season with silver at the Philadelphia Summer International and then took bronze at the 2018 CS U.S. International Figure Skating Classic. He made his Grand Prix debut at the 2018 Skate America.

=== 2019–2020 season ===
Ma won the gold medal at the 2020 Eastern Sectionals, earning him a spot at the 2020 U.S. Championships, where he placed thirteenth. He competed internationally at two Challenger events, placing sixth at the U.S. Classic and fourth at Finlandia Trophy.

=== 2020–2021 season ===
Due to the coronavirus pandemic limiting travel, Ma was assigned to compete on the Grand Prix at the 2020 Skate America. He placed tenth at the event.

Ma placed sixth at the 2021 U.S. Championships, the best result of his senior career.

=== 2021–2022 season: Four Continents debut ===
Ma started his season with a silver medal at the Cranberry Cup. A couple of weeks later, he won another silver medal at the U.S. Classic. He was named to the team for the 2021 Asian Open Trophy, but the entire American team was later withdrawn. He was later named to the team for the 2021 Skate America as a replacement for Yaroslav Paniot. He placed fifth overall at the event, including an unexpected third place in the short program. Ma was subsequently assigned to two additional Challenger events, coming sixteenth at the 2021 CS Warsaw Cup before winning a bronze medal at the 2021 CS Golden Spin of Zagreb.

Hoping to qualify for the American Olympic team, Ma competed at the 2022 U.S. Championships but finished in sixth place. He was instead sent to the 2022 Four Continents Championships in Tallinn, where he finished tenth.

=== 2022–2023 season ===
At the 2022 CS U.S. Classic, Ma initially placed eighth in the short program. He rebounded in the free skate, finishing third in that segment and rising to fifth place overall. On the Grand Prix at the 2022 Skate Canada International, Ma finished ninth. He came seventh at the 2022 MK John Wilson Trophy.

Ma finished fifth at the 2023 U.S. Championships. This in turn earned him an assignment to the 2023 Four Continents Championships. Despite a slight underrotation on his triple Axel in the short program at Four Continents, Ma placed third in the segment, winning a bronze small medal. He said that he was "really glad that I was able to retire this program on a good note." The free skate proved more difficult, and he dropped to ninth.

=== 2023–2024 season ===
Ma won the bronze medal at the Skating Club of Boston's Cranberry Cup event, before coming ninth at the 2023 CS Autumn Classic International and fifth at the Shanghai Trophy. Ma subsequently competed on the 2023–24 Grand Prix circuit, finishing ninth at the 2023 Cup of China and eleventh at the 2023 Grand Prix of Espoo. He then closed off the season with a sixth-place finish at the 2024 U.S. Championships. “I’ve been trying to hold down a lot of emotion,” he said after the free skate. “I’ve been trying to really keep a level head and a level heart throughout this whole season.

=== 2024–2025 season: Four Continents bronze ===
Ma began the season by competing on the 2024–25 ISU Challenger Series, winning bronze at the 2024 CS Cranberry Cup International, finishing sixth at the 2024 CS Lombardia Trophy, and sixth at the 2024 CS Tallinn Trophy.

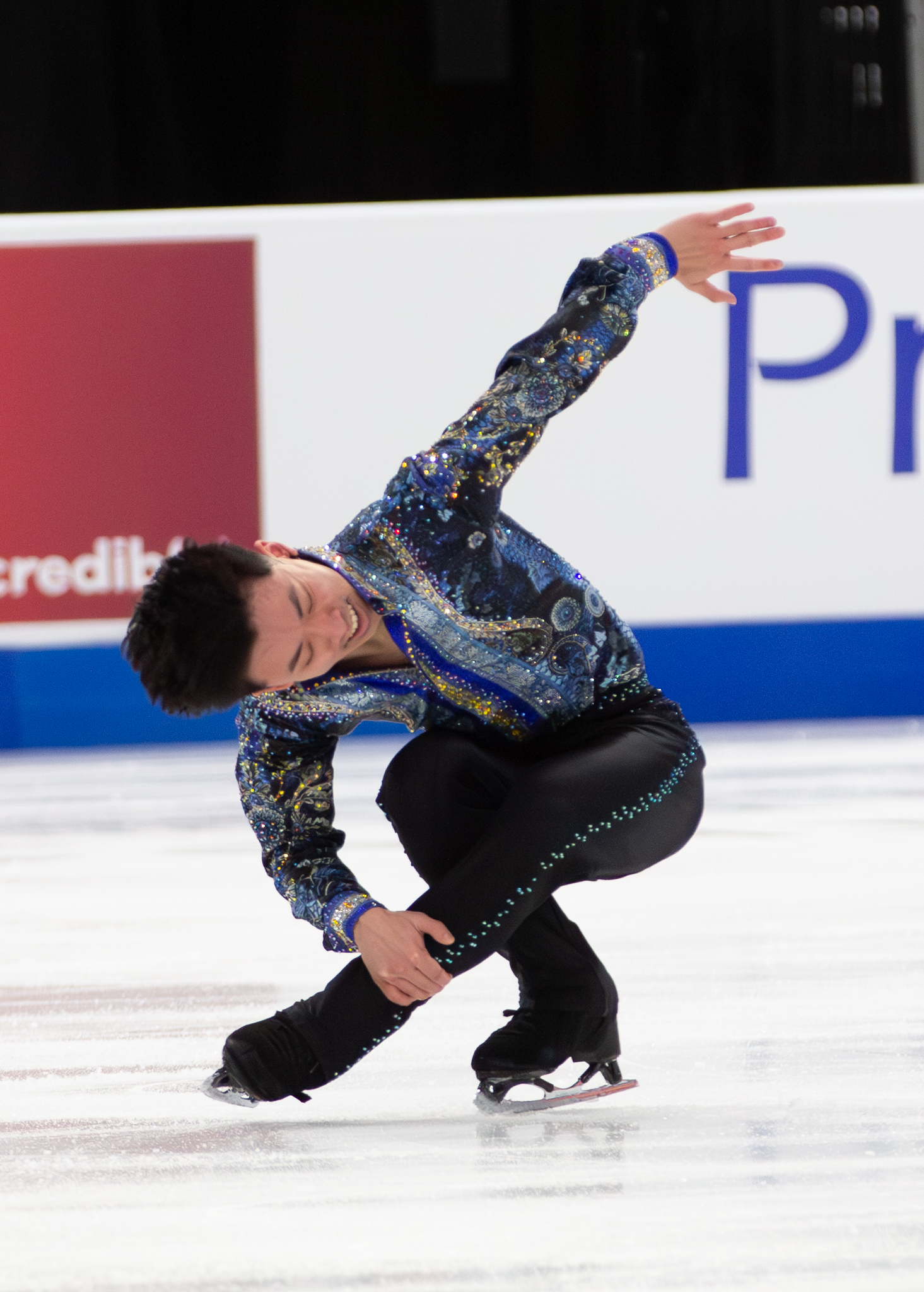
Ma performing a sit spin during his free skate at the 2026 U.S. Championships

In January, at the 2025 U.S. Championships, Ma placed third in the short program and seventh in the free skate, finishing in fifth place overall. Following the withdrawal of Andrew Torgashev, Ma was assigned to compete at the 2025 Four Continents Championships in Seoul, South Korea the following month. Ma placed second in the short program and third in the free skate, winning the bronze medal overall. With the event taking place a few weeks following the 2025 Potomac River mid-air collision, which killed four members of the Skating Club of Boston, Ma dedicated his medal to the victims, including Evgenia Shishkova, Vadim Naumov, Jinna Han, Spencer Lane, as well as Han and Lane's mothers, Jin Han and Christine Lane.

On March 2, 2025, Ma took part in Legacy on Ice, an ice show organized by U.S. Figure Skating that paid tribute to lives lost aboard American Eagle Flight 5342. He performed to "One Day I'll Fly Away," which was set to be Jinna Han's competitive routine for the upcoming season.

=== 2025–2026 season ===
Ma started the season by competing on the 2025–26 Challenger Series, finishing seventh at the 2025 CS Cranberry Cup International and tenth at the 2025 CS Kinoshita Group Cup. Going on to compete on the 2025–26 Grand Prix series, Ma placed tenth at the 2025 NHK Trophy and eleventh at the 2025 Finlandia Trophy.

In January, Ma competed at the 2026 U.S. Championships, where he finished in eleventh place.

=== 2026–2027 season ===
Ma opened the new season by placing ninth at the 2026 CS Nebelhorn Trophy. Following this, Ma competed at the 2026 Grand Prix de France where he placed sixth overall.

== Programs ==
Season	Short program	Free skating	Exhibition
2011–2012	The Untouchables: Theme by Ennio Morricone	El Tango de los Exilados by Vanessa-Mae	
2012–2013	Montserrat by Orquesta del Plata, Bajofondo choreo. by Josh Babb	Heart of Courage; Lacrimosa Dominae by Two Steps from Hell choreo. by Josh Babb	
2013–2014	Montserrat by Orquesta del Plata, Bajofondo choreo. by Josh Babb	The Way by Zack Hemsey choreo. by Josh Babb	
2014–2015	Grand Guignol by Bajofondo choreo. by Josh Babb	Adiós Nonino by Astor Piazzolla choreo. by Josh Babb	
2017–2018	Propaganda; Turn Down for What by DJ Snake choreo. by Joshua Farris, Nikolai Morozov	Piano Concerto No. 2 in C Minor by Sergei Rachmaninoff choreo. by Joshua Farris, Nikolai Morozov	
2018–2019	Mi Gente by J Balvin, Beyoncé choreo. by Joshua Farris, Nikolai Morozov	Piano Concerto No. 2 in C Minor by Sergei Rachmaninoff choreo. by Joshua Farris, Nikolai Morozov	Propaganda; Turn Down for What by DJ Snake choreo. by Joshua Farris, Nikolai Morozov
2019–2020	Harder, Better, Faster, Stronger by Daft Punk; Stronger by Kanye West choreo. by Samuel Chouinard, Pasquale Camerlengo, Nikolai Morozov	Blues for Klook by Eddy Louiss choreo. by Samuel Chouinard, Pasquale Camerlengo, Nikolai Morozov	
2020–2021	Come Together performed by Gary Clark Jr. choreo. by Nikolai Morozov, Misha Ge	The Catalyst by Linkin Park choreo. by Nikolai Morozov, Misha Ge	
2021–2022	Black Swan by Clint Mansell choreo. by Nikolai Morozov	Attack on Titan; Vogel im Käfig by Cyau, Hiroyuki Sawano; T-Kt by Hiroyuki Sawano; Ashes on the Fire by Kohta Yamamoto choreo. by Nikolai Morozov	
2022–2023	Black Swan by Clint Mansell choreo. by Nikolai Morozov; Warriors by 2WEI ft. Edda Hayes choreo. by Benoît Richaud	Clair de Lune by Claude Debussy; Volcano by Woodkid choreo. by Nikolai Morozov, Adam Blake	Movie Star by CIX
2023–2024	Hernando's Hideaway by Jerry Ross & Richard Adler; Tank! (from Cowboy Bebop) by Yoko Kanno & Seatbelts choreo. by Nikolai Morozov	The Phantom of the Opera by Andrew Lloyd Webber; Prelude (Age Of Heroes) by Balázs Havasi; Lacrimosa by Wolfgang Amadeus Mozart performed by Apashe choreo. Adam Blake	Movie Star by CIX
2024–2025	Mexican Phonk Eki by NUEKI & TOLCHONOV choreo. by Nikolai Morozov	Clair de Lune by Claude Debussy; Volcano by Woodkid choreo. by Nikolai Morozov, Adam Blake; La terre vue du ciel by Armand Amar choreo. by Jeffrey Buttle	One Day I'll Fly Away by Randy Crawford performed by Vaults; Daddy by Psy ft. CL
2025–2026	The Firebird Suite by Igor Stravinsky performed by Isakson Foundation Music Collective; Witchdoctor by Camo & Krooked choreo. by Nikolai Morozov	Nessun dorma (from Turandot) by Giacomo Puccini performed by L'orchestre Mantovani; Turandot: Nessun Dorma! by Giacomo Puccini performed by Luciano Pavarotti, John Alldis Choir, Wandsworth School Boys Choir, London Philharmonic Orchestra, & Zubin Mehta choreo. by Nikolai Morozov; Can't Take My Eyes Off You by Frankie Valli performed by Piano Dust Covers; It's Raining Men by The Weather Girls; Macho Man; Y.M.C.A. by Village People choreo. by Nikolai Morozov	

== Competitive highlights ==
- GP – Event of the ISU Grand Prix Series
- JGP – Event of the ISU Junior Grand Prix Series
- CS – Event of the ISU Challenger Series
- TBD – Assigned
- WD – Withdrew from competition

Competition placements at senior level
Season	2014–15	2015–16	2016–17	2017–18	2018–19	2019–20	2020–21	2021–22	2022–23	2023–24	2024–25	2025–26	2026–27
Four Continents Championships								10th	9th		3rd		
U.S. Championships	18th	16th	20th	11th	10th	13th	6th	6th	5th	6th	5th	11th	
GP Cup of China										9th			
GP Finland										11th		11th	
GP France													6th
GP NHK Trophy												10th	
GP Skate America					12th		10th	5th					
GP Skate Canada									9th				
GP Wilson Trophy									7th				
CS Autumn Classic										9th			
CS Cranberry Cup											3rd	7th	
CS Finlandia Trophy						4th							
CS Golden Spin of Zagreb								3rd					
CS Kinoshita Group Cup												10th	
CS Lombardia Trophy											6th		
CS Nebelhorn Trophy													9th
CS Tallinn Trophy											6th		11th
CS U.S. Classic					3rd	6th			5th				
CS Warsaw Cup								16th					
Coupe du Printemps									1st				
Cranberry Cup								2nd		3rd			
Philadelphia Summer					2nd								
Shanghai Trophy										5th			
U.S. Classic								2nd					

Competition placements at junior level
Season	2012–13	2013–14	2014–15
U.S. Championships	4th	3rd	
JGP Japan			14th
JGP Latvia		13th	
Gardena Spring Trophy	3rd		

== Detailed results ==
ISU personal best scores in the +5/-5 GOE System
Segment	Type	Score	Event
Total	TSS	250.97	2021 CS Golden Spin of Zagreb
Short program	TSS	86.64	2023 Four Continents Championships
Short program	TES	47.39	2023 Four Continents Championships
Short program	PCS	39.25	2023 Four Continents Championships
Free skating	TSS	170.13	2021 CS Golden Spin of Zagreb
Free skating	TES	91.03	2021 CS Golden Spin of Zagreb
Free skating	PCS	79.10	2021 CS Golden Spin of Zagreb

=== Senior level ===
Results in the 2014–15 season
Date	Event	SP		FS		Total	
Date	Event	P	Score	P	Score	P	Score
Jan 18–25, 2015	(United States) 2015 U.S. Championships	16	59.09	18	105.65	18	164.74

Results in the 2015–16 season
Date	Event	SP		FS		Total	
Date	Event	P	Score	P	Score	P	Score
Jan 15–24, 2016	(United States) 2016 U.S. Championships	15	51.95	17	109.68	16	161.63

Results in the 2016–17 season
Date	Event	SP		FS		Total	
Date	Event	P	Score	P	Score	P	Score
Jan 14–22, 2017	(United States) 2017 U.S. Championships	15	70.41	21	110.66	20	181.07

Results in the 2017–18 season
Date	Event	SP		FS		Total	
Date	Event	P	Score	P	Score	P	Score
Dec 29 – Jan 8, 2018	(United States) 2018 U.S. Championships	11	75.28	11	147.13	11	222.41

Results in the 2018–19 season
Date	Event	SP		FS		Total	
Date	Event	P	Score	P	Score	P	Score
Aug 3–5, 2018	(United States) 2018 Philadelphia Summer International	4	67.32	2	131.56	2	198.88
Sep 12–16, 2018	(United States) 2018 CS U.S. Classic	4	73.21	3	132.89	3	206.10
Nov 11–18, 2018	(United States) 2018 Skate America	7	71.85	12	113.53	12	185.06
Jan 19–27, 2019	(United States) 2019 U.S. Championships	10	74.84	11	132.08	10	206.92

Results in the 2019–20 season
Date	Event	SP		FS		Total	
Date	Event	P	Score	P	Score	P	Score
Sep 17–22, 2019	(United States) 2019 CS U.S. Classic	6	67.34	6	132.96	6	200.30
Oct 11–13, 2019	(Finland) 2019 CS Finlandia Trophy	8	66.48	2	147.01	4	213.49
Jan 20–26, 2020	(United States) 2020 U.S. Championships	12	71.54	13	122.31	13	193.85

Results in the 2020–21 season
Date	Event	SP		FS		Total	
Date	Event	P	Score	P	Score	P	Score
Oct 23–24, 2020	(United States) 2020 Skate America	11	63.36	10	133.62	10	196.98
Jan 11–21, 2021	(United States) 2021 U.S. Championships	6	82.30	8	148.48	6	230.78

Results in the 2021–22 season
Date	Event	SP		FS		Total	
Date	Event	P	Score	P	Score	P	Score
Aug 11–15, 2021	(United States) 2021 Cranberry Cup International	2	78.30	2	152.29	2	230.59
Sep 14–17, 2021	(United States) 2021 U.S. Classic	2	84.07	2	149.51	2	233.58
Oct 22–24, 2021	(United States) 2021 Skate America	3	84.52	10	143.60	5	228.12
Nov 17–20, 2021	(Poland) 2021 CS Warsaw Cup	10	71.49	19	123.60	16	195.09
Dec 7–11, 2021	(Croatia) 2021 CS Golden Spin of Zagreb	5	80.84	2	170.13	3	250.97
Jan 3–9, 2022	(United States) 2022 U.S. Championships	5	91.62	8	135.36	6	226.98
Jan 18–23, 2022	(Estonia) 2022 Four Continents Championships	9	69.98	9	145.14	10	215.12

Results in the 2022–23 season
Date	Event	SP		FS		Total	
Date	Event	P	Score	P	Score	P	Score
Sep 13–16, 2022	(United States) 2022 CS U.S. Classic	8	69.98	3	146.88	5	216.76
Oct 28–30, 2022	2022 Skate Canada International	9	61.73	9	142.66	9	204.39
Nov 11–13, 2022	(United Kingdom) 2022 MK John Wilson Trophy	6	77.72	7	137.75	7	214.47
Jan 23–29, 2023	(United States) 2023 U.S. Championships	7	73.88	5	169.21	5	243.09
Feb 7–12, 2023	(United States) 2023 Four Continents Championships	3	86.64	13	134.40	9	221.04
Mar 17–19, 2023	(Luxembourg) 2023 Coupe du Printemps	1	80.94	1	141.79	1	222.73

Results in the 2023–24 season
Date	Event	SP		FS		Total	
Date	Event	P	Score	P	Score	P	Score
Aug 9–13, 2023	(United States) 2023 Cranberry Cup International	1	83.05	3	139.44	3	222.49
Sep 14–17, 2023	(Canada) 2023 CS Autumn Classic International	9	66.03	9	125.05	9	191.08
Oct 3–5, 2023	(China) 2023 Shanghai Trophy	5	62.30	4	137.03	5	199.23
Nov 10–12, 2023	2023 Cup of China	7	77.29	10	127.87	9	205.16
Nov 17–19, 2023	(Finland) 2023 Grand Prix of Espoo	3	80.19	11	111.07	11	191.26
Jan 22–28, 2024	(United States) 2024 U.S. Championships	9	76.54	6	162.03	6	238.57

Results in the 2024–25 season
Date	Event	SP		FS		Total	
Date	Event	P	Score	P	Score	P	Score
Aug 8–11, 2024	(United States) 2024 CS Cranberry Cup International	7	78.24	2	158.53	3	236.77
Sep 13–15, 2024	(Italy) 2024 CS Lombardia Trophy	7	73.01	5	156.40	6	229.41
Nov 12–17, 2024	(Estonia) 2024 CS Tallinn Trophy	11	66.27	4	143.44	6	209.71
Jan 20–26, 2025	(United States) 2025 U.S. Championships	3	91.91	7	144.87	5	236.78
Feb 19–23, 2025	(South Korea) 2025 Four Continents Championships	2	82.52	3	162.49	3	245.01

Results in the 2025–26 season
Date	Event	SP		FS		Total	
Date	Event	P	Score	P	Score	P	Score
Aug 7–10, 2025	(United States) 2025 CS Cranberry Cup International	1	78.74	11	128.79	7	207.53
Sep 5–7, 2025	(Japan) 2025 CS Kinoshita Group Cup	5	83.52	11	135.00	10	218.52
Nov 7–9, 2025	(Japan) 2025 NHK Trophy	10	69.44	9	139.12	10	208.56
Nov 21–23, 2025	(Finland) 2025 Finlandia Trophy	10	67.99	11	128.12	11	196.11
Jan 4–11, 2026	(United States) 2026 U.S. Championships	11	75.56	8	150.15	11	225.71

Results in the 2026–27 season
Date	Event	SP		FS		Total	
Date	Event	P	Score	P	Score	P	Score
Sep 24–26, 2026	(Germany) 2026 CS Nebelhorn Trophy	8	73.75	9	132.12	9	205.87
Oct 23–25, 2026	2026 Grand Prix de France	7	77.11	6	144.33	6	221.44
Nov 16–22, 2026	(Estonia) 2026 CS Tallinn Trophy	9	64.64	12	109.81	11	174.45

=== Junior level ===
Results in the 2012–13 season
Date	Event	SP		FS		Total	
Date	Event	P	Score	P	Score	P	Score
Jan 20–27, 2013	(United States) 2013 U.S. Championships (Junior)	4	57.88	3	118.21	4	176.09
Apr 2–3, 2017	(Italy) 2013 Gardena Spring Trophy	4	55.08	3	98.90	3	153.98

Results in the 2013–14 season
Date	Event	SP		FS		Total	
Date	Event	P	Score	P	Score	P	Score
Aug 28–31, 2013	2013 JGP Latvia	10	56.31	15	91.48	13	147.79
Jan 5–12, 2014	(United States) 2014 U.S. Championships (Junior)	2	63.46	3	119.27	3	182.73

Results in the 2013–14 season
Date	Event	SP		FS		Total	
Date	Event	P	Score	P	Score	P	Score
Sep 10–14, 2014	(Japan) 2014 JGP Latvia	14	47.81	14	91.90	14	139.71
