= Sonja Hilmer =

American figure skater (born 1999)

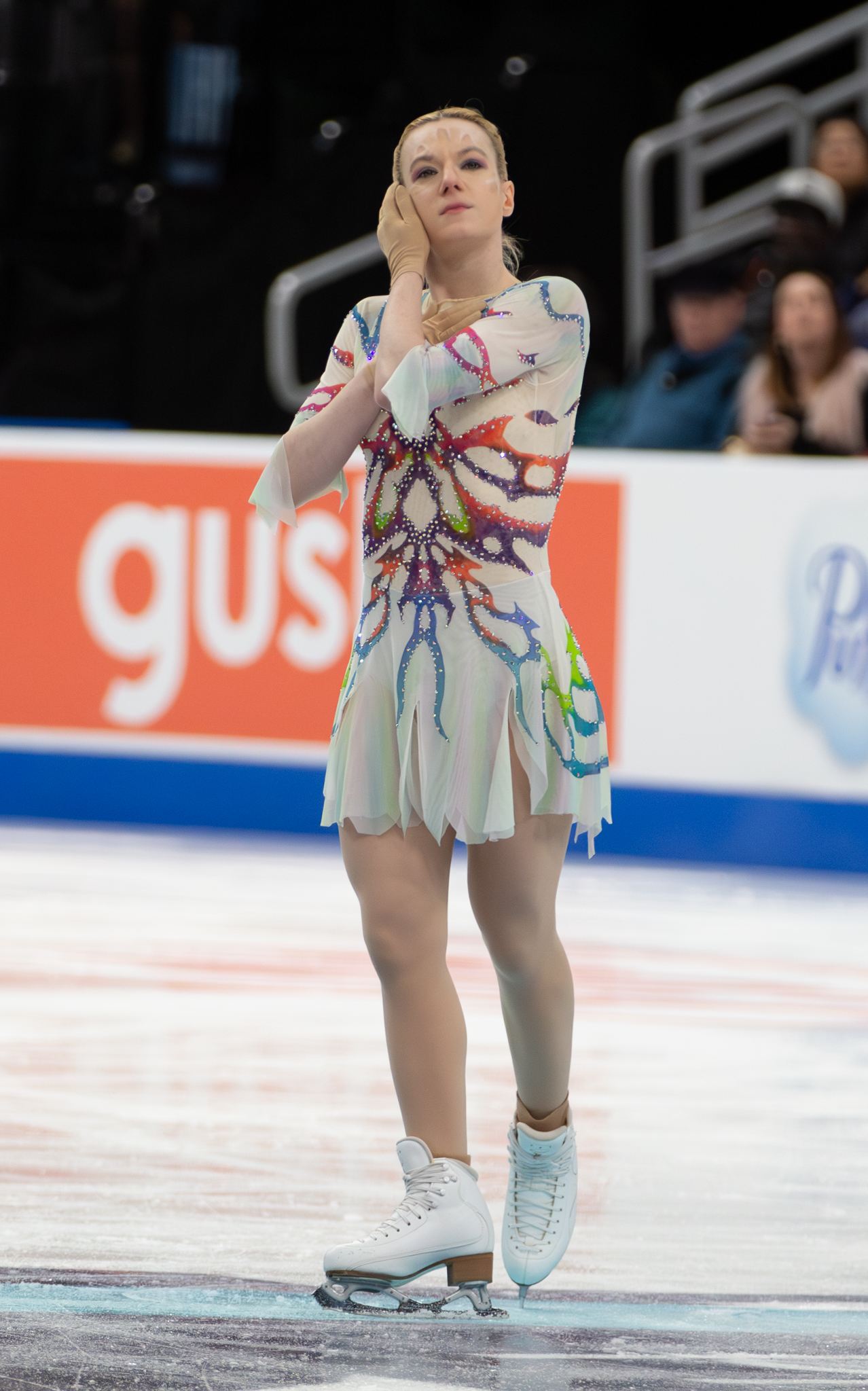
- Hilmer at the 2026 U.S. National Championships

Personal information
- Born: June 13, 1999 (age 27) Mount Kisco, New York, U.S.
- Home town: Colorado Springs, Colorado, U.S.
- Height: 5 ft 3 in (1.60 m)

Figure skating career
- Country: United States
- Discipline: Women's singles
- Coach: Damon Allen; Eddie Shipstad
- Skating club: Centennial Skating Club
- Began skating: 2003

Sonja Hilmer (born June 13, 1999) is an American singles figure skater. She began representing the United States internationally starting in the 2022–23 season.

== Personal life ==
Sonja Hilmer was born on June 13, 1999, in Mount Kisco, New York in the United States. She graduated from the Laurel Springs School and is currently studying illustration. Hilmer has interests in arts and crafts with specializations in sewing, embroidery, resin casting, and thermoplastics. She uses her skills in these crafts to create her skating costumes. Additionally, Hilmer is interested in music, coin collecting, and rock collecting.

== Career ==
=== Early career ===
Hilmer initially wanted to start skating at age two after reading a children's book, but she began at three years old after a family trip took her to the ice.

=== 2022–23 season ===
Hilmer began the season at the Glacier Falls Summer Classic. She won the event with a 177.72 total, her personal best domestic score. Hilmer landed the first triple Salchow jump-double Salchow combination at this event, a unique jump combination that requires a change of skating edge on the landing of the first Salchow followed by jumping the second Salchow by rotating in the opposite direction. Following that, Hilmer competed in the 2022 Cranberry Cup, finishing in second place. As the year continued, Hilmer qualified for her first U.S. Championships by finishing in third place at the Midwestern Sectional Championships. At Hilmer's first nationals, she placed thirteenth in the short program and finished eighth in the free skate to place tenth overall at the competition.

=== 2023–24 season ===
Starting the 2023–2024 season, Hilmer finished second at the Broadmoor Open and sixth at the Glacier Falls Summer Classic. Her first international competition of the season was the 2023 Cranberry Cup, where she placed fifth overall with a total score of 161.40. Hilmer was assigned to the 2023 Nebelhorn Trophy, her first international competition, alongside Isabeau Levito. At the Nebelhorn Trophy, Hilmer finished ninth in the short program and seventh in the free skate, allowing her to finish seventh overall. Hilmer again qualified at the 2024 U.S. Championships through the Midwestern Sectionals, where she finished in third place. At Nationals, Hilmer finished twelfth overall, struggling with the short program and coming back with a redeeming free skate.

=== 2024–25 season ===
Hilmer began the season by finishing seventh at the 2024 CS Cranberry Cup International. She followed this up by winning bronze at the 2024 Santa Claus Cup. Appearing at the 2025 U.S. Championships, she placed eleventh in the short program and eighth in the free skate to finish in ninth place overall.

=== 2025–26 season ===
Hilmer started the season by competing on the 2025–26 Challenger Series, finishing fourth at the 2025 CS Cranberry Cup International and twelfth at the 2025 CS Kinoshita Group Cup.

In January, Hilmer competed at the 2026 U.S. Championships, where she finished in fourteenth place.

== Programs ==
Season	Short program	Free skating
2022–23	Beautiful; Fighter by Christina Aguilera choreo. by Sonja Hilmer	Arcane; The Bridge; What Could Have Been by Ray Chen & Sting choreo. by Sonja Hilmer
2023–24	Clubbed to Death (from The Matrix) by Rob Dougan choreo. by Sonja Hilmer	Avatar: The Last Airbender by The Track Team & Samuel Kim choreo. by Sonja Hilmer
2024–25	Unforgettable (from Finding Dory) performed by Sia choreo. by Sonja Hilmer	Argylle; You're the First, the Last, My Everything by Barry White; Now and Then by The Beatles; Electric Energy by Ariana DeBose choreo. by Sonja Hilmer; Earth Melodies by Ekaterina Shelehova; Forest Dance by Filip Lackovic; Conjuring Storms; Savage Daughter; If I Had a Heart by Ekaterina Shelehova choreo. by Sonja Hilmer
2025–26	Strange Meadow Lark by Dave Brubeck & Iola Brubeck; Take Five by Dave Brubeck & Paul Desmond; I Get a Kick Out of You by Cole Porter; Blade Recording Overlay by Sonja Hilmer choreo. by Sonja Hilmer	This Is Good - Zheyang Hen Hao (Isha's Song) (from Arcane) by Eason Chan, Zheng Nan, & Lyu Yiqiu choreo. by Sonja Hilmer
2026–27	Mambo No. 5 by Dámaso Pérez Prado; Bailar by Deorro ft. Pitbull choreo. by Sonja Hilmer	How to Train Your Dragon; Stoick’s Ship by John Powell; For the Dancing and the Dreaming by Craig Ferguson, Gerard Butler, & Mary Jane Wells; Where No One Goes by John Powell & Jónsi; Coming Back Around by John Powell choreo. by Sonja Hilmer

== Competitive highlights ==
- CS – Event of the ISU Challenger Series

Competition placements at senior level
Season	2022–23	2023–24	2024–25	2025–26	2026–27
U.S. Championships	10th	12th	9th	14th	
CS Cranberry Cup	2nd	5th	7th	4th	
CS Kinoshita Group Cup				12th	WD
CS Nebelhorn Trophy		7th			
CS U.S. Classic	5th				
Santa Claus Cup			3rd		

== Detailed results ==
ISU personal best scores in the +5/-5 GOE System
Segment	Type	Score	Event
Total	TSS	174.76	2022 CS U.S. International Classic
Short program	TSS	59.34	2025 CS Cranberry Cup International
Short program	TES	31.81	2025 CS Cranberry Cup International
Short program	PCS	28.94	2025 CS Kinoshita Group Cup
Free skating	TSS	116.53	2022 CS U.S. International Classic
Free skating	TES	60.25	2022 CS U.S. International Classic
Free skating	PCS	57.28	2022 CS U.S. International Classic

=== Senior level ===
Results in the 2024–25 season
Date	Event	SP		FS		Total	
Date	Event	P	Score	P	Score	P	Score
Nov 27–Dec 2, 2024	(Hungary) 2024 Santa Claus Cup	2	57.79	3	101.14	3	158.93
Jan 20–26, 2025	(United States) 2025 U.S. Championships	11	59.57	8	118.97	9	178.54

Results in the 2025–26 season
Date	Event	SP		FS		Total	
Date	Event	P	Score	P	Score	P	Score
Aug 7–10, 2025	(United States) 2025 CS Cranberry Cup International	4	59.34	4	106.49	4	165.83
Sep 5–7, 2025	(Japan) 2025 CS Kinoshita Group Cup	10	55.72	13	88.95	12	144.67
Jan 4–11, 2026	(United States) 2026 U.S. Championships	13	55.00	15	100.25	14	155.25
