= 2025 CS Cranberry Cup International =

International figure skating competition

2025 Cranberry Cup International
- Type: ISU Challenger Series
- Date: August 7 – 10
- Season: 2025–26
- Location: Norwood, Massachusetts, United States
- Host: U.S. Figure Skating
- Venue: Skating Club of Boston

Champions
- Men's singles: (Canada) Roman Sadovsky
- Women's singles: (United States) Isabeau Levito
- Previous: 2024 CS Cranberry Cup International
- Next: 2026 CS Cranberry Cup International
- Next CS: 2025 CS John Nicks International Pairs Competition

The 2025 Cranberry Cup International was a figure skating competition sanctioned by the International Skating Union (ISU), organized and hosted by U.S. Figure Skating, and the first event of the 2025–26 ISU Challenger Series. It was held at the Skating Club of Boston in Norwood, Massachusetts, in the United States, from August 7 to 10. Medals were awarded in men's and women's singles, and skaters earned ISU World Standing points based on their results. Roman Sadovsky of Canada won the men's event and Isabeau Levito of the United States won the women's event.

== Background ==
The inaugural edition of the Cranberry Cup International was held in 2021 at the Skating Club of Boston in Norwood, Massachusetts, in the United States. The 2025 Cranberry Cup was held from August 7 to 10.

The ISU Challenger Series was introduced in 2014. It is a series of international figure skating competitions sanctioned by the International Skating Union (ISU) and organized by ISU member nations. The objective was to ensure consistent organization and structure within a series of international competitions linked together, providing opportunities for senior-level skaters to compete at the international level and also earn ISU World Standing points. The 2025–26 Challenger Series consisted of eleven events, of which the Cranberry Cup International was the first. The Cranberry Cup International is held in conjunction with the John Nicks Pairs Challenge – the former hosts the men's and women's events, while the latter hosts the pairs event – and the two competitions constitute U.S. Figure Skating's contribution to the Challenger Series.

== Changes to preliminary assignments ==
The International Skating Union (ISU) published the preliminary list of entrants on July 22, 2025.

Date	Discipline	Withdrew	Added	Ref.
July 26	Men	(France) Luc Economides	—N/a	
July 26	Men	(Kazakhstan) Nikita Krivosheyev	—N/a	
July 26	Men	(Kazakhstan) Artur Smagulov	—N/a	
July 26	Women	—N/a	(Kazakhstan) Sofia Samodelkina	
August 4	Women	(Argentina) Michelle Di Cicco	—N/a	
August 6	Women	(Australia) Victoria Alcantara	—N/a	
August 6	Women	(Netherlands) Jolanda Vos	—N/a	

== Required performance elements ==
Men and women competing in single skating first performed a short program on August 9. Lasting no more than 2 minutes 40 seconds, the short program had to include the following elements:

For men: one double or triple Axel; one triple or quadruple jump; one jump combination consisting of a double jump and a triple jump, two triple jumps, or a quadruple jump and a double jump or triple jump; one flying spin; one camel spin or sit spin with a change of foot; one spin combination with a change of foot; and a step sequence using the full ice surface.

For women: one double or triple Axel; one triple jump; one jump combination consisting of a double jump and a triple jump, or two triple jumps; one flying spin; one layback spin, sideways leaning spin, camel spin, or sit spin without a change of foot; one spin combination with a change of foot; and one step sequence using the full ice surface.

Skaters performed their free skates on August 10. The free skate for both men and women could last no more than 4 minutes, and had to include the maximum of the following: seven jump elements, of which one had to be an Axel-type jump; three spins, of which one had to be a spin combination, one a flying spin, and one a spin with only one position; a step sequence; and a choreographic sequence.

== Judging ==
Skaters were judged according to the required technical elements of their program (such as jumps and spins), as well as the overall presentation of their program, based on three program components (skating skills, presentation, and composition). Each technical element in a figure skating performance was assigned a predetermined base point value and scored by a panel of nine judges on a scale from −5 to +5 based on the quality of its execution. Each Grade of Execution (GOE) from –5 to +5 was assigned a value as indicated on the Scale of Values. For example, a triple Axel was worth a base value of 8.00 points, and a GOE of +3 was worth 2.40 points, so a triple Axel with a GOE of +3 earned 10.40 points. The judging panel's GOE for each element was determined by calculating the trimmed mean (the average after discarding the highest and lowest scores). The panel's scores for all elements were added together to generate a Total Elements Score. At the same time, the judges evaluated each performance based on the five aforementioned program components and assigned each a score from 0.25 to 10 in 0.25-point increments. The judging panel's final score for each program component was also determined by calculating the trimmed mean. Those scores were then multiplied by the factor shown on the chart below; the results were added together to generate a total Program Component Score.

Program component factoring
Discipline	Short program	Free skate
Men	1.67	3.33
Women	1.33	2.67

Deductions were applied for certain violations, such as time infractions, stops and restarts, or falls. The Total Elements Score and Program Component Score were then added together, minus any deductions, to generate a final performance score for each skater or team.

== Medal summary ==
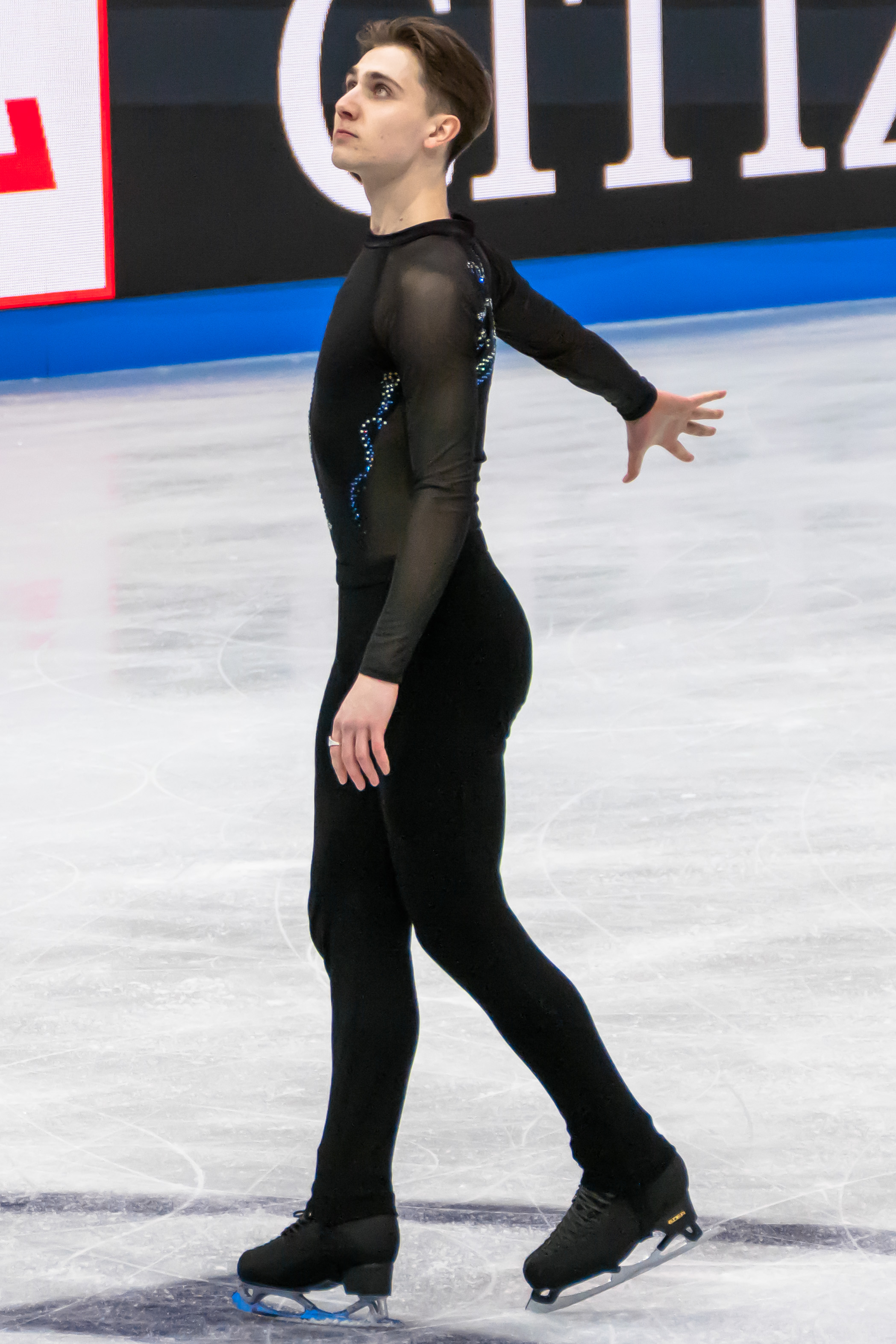
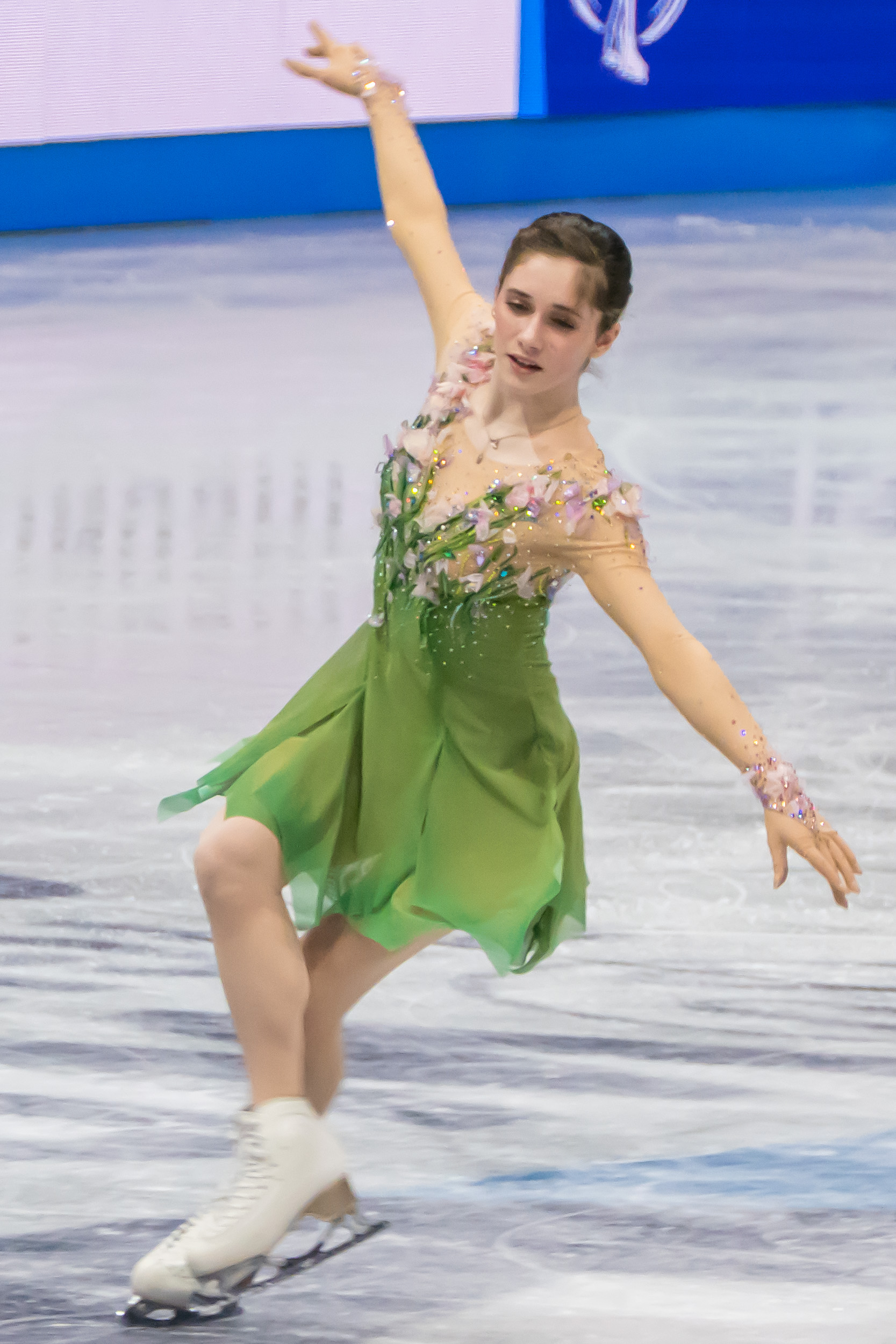
The 2025 Cranberry Cup International champions: Roman Sadovsky of Canada (men's singles) and Isabeau Levito of the United States (women's singles)

Medalists
Discipline	Gold	Silver	Bronze
Men	(Canada) Roman Sadovsky	(Estonia) Aleksandr Selevko	(Canada) Stephen Gogolev
Women	(United States) Isabeau Levito	(Kazakhstan) Sofia Samodelkina	(South Korea) Shin Ji-a

== Results ==
=== Men's singles ===
Roman Sadovsky of Canada won his first senior-level gold medal after two solid performances. Stephen Gogolev of Canada also had successful results, including receiving the highest technical score in the free skate, which included two quadruple Salchows and a quadruple toe loop, and ultimately winning the bronze medal. Aleksandr Selevko of Estonia won the silver medal with two solid performances that included a quadruple Lutz and quadruple toe loop in his free skate. Jimmy Ma of the United States had the lead after the short program; however multiple errors in his free skate caused him to ultimately finish in seventh place.

Men's results
Rank	Skater	Nation	Total	SP		FS	
1st place, gold medalist(s)	Roman Sadovsky	Canada	243.23	5	74.76	1	168.47
2nd place, silver medalist(s)	Aleksandr Selevko	Estonia	235.70	3	76.62	3	159.08
3rd place, bronze medalist(s)	Stephen Gogolev	Canada	231.81	11	67.22	2	164.59
4	Tamir Kuperman	Israel	211.87	4	75.04	5	136.83
5	Jacob Sanchez	United States	211.31	2	78.60	7	132.71
6	Donovan Carrillo	Mexico	208.51	6	70.65	4	137.86
7	Jimmy Ma	United States	207.53	1	78.74	11	128.79
8	Liam Kapeikis	United States	201.94	8	69.65	8	132.29
9	Tomoki Hiwatashi	United States	201.66	9	69.45	9	132.21
10	Lee Jae-keun	South Korea	198.50	10	68.55	10	129.95
11	Mark Gorodnitsky	Israel	193.08	15	58.49	6	134.59
12	Kai Kovar	United States	189.91	7	69.75	13	120.16
13	Semen Daniliants	Armenia	187.48	12	66.22	12	121.26
14	Lev Vinokur	Israel	170.34	13	59.39	14	110.95
15	Lim Ju-heon	South Korea	161.89	16	56.83	15	105.06
16	Daniel Martynov	United States	153.00	14	58.83	16	94.17
17	Jared Sedlis	United States	139.71	17	51.98	17	87.73

=== Women's singles ===
Isabeau Levito of the United States ultimately won the gold medal despite some issues with her free skate, where she had difficulty with her triple flip-double Axel jump sequence. Likewise, Sofia Samodelkina of Kazakhstan had some difficulties, including under-rotated jumps, but ended up winning the silver medal. Shin Ji-a of South Korea, a four-time World Junior Championship silver medalist, appeared visibly nervous and had several falls in her free skate, but her high quality transitions and spins allowed her to win the bronze medal.

Women's results
Rank	Skater	Nation	Total	SP		FS	
1st place, gold medalist(s)	Isabeau Levito	United States	207.61	1	70.69	2	136.92
2nd place, silver medalist(s)	Sofia Samodelkina	Kazakhstan	203.15	2	65.80	1	137.35
3rd place, bronze medalist(s)	Shin Ji-a	South Korea	179.97	3	62.12	3	117.85
4	Sonja Hilmer	United States	165.83	4	59.34	4	106.49
5	Josephine Lee	United States	160.99	5	56.04	5	104.95
6	Katie Shen	United States	154.75	8	50.35	6	104.40
7	Olivia Elin Phillips	Sweden	147.05	11	47.01	7	100.04
8	Andrea Montesinos Cantú	Mexico	146.96	7	50.93	8	96.03
9	Kim Min-chae	South Korea	140.95	6	53.82	10	87.13
10	Brooke Gewalt	United States	136.83	9	48.92	9	87.91
11	Sienna Kaczmarczyk	Australia	132.63	10	48.44	11	84.19
12	Andrea Astrain Maynez	Mexico	125.02	12	42.19	12	82.83
13	Petra Lahti	New Zealand	115.90	13	38.88	13	77.02
14	Simona Bhasin	Australia	94.93	14	31.81	14	63.12
15	Alejandra Osuna Tirado	Mexico	87.13	15	31.62	16	55.51
16	Sophia Natalie Dayan	Argentina	85.52	17	23.45	15	62.07
17	Mya Li Poe	Chinese Taipei	84.31	16	29.11	17	55.20
WD	Dimitra Korri	Greece	Withdrew	18	22.60	Withdrew from competition	

== Works cited ==
- "Special Regulations & Technical Rules – Single & Pair Skating and Ice Dance 2024" (PDF). International Skating Union. Archived (PDF) from the original on June 3, 2025.
