= 2025 CS Nepela Memorial =

Figure skating competition

- Type: ISU Challenger Series
- Date: 25 – 27 September
- Season: 2025–26
- Location: Bratislava, Slovakia
- Host: Slovak Figure Skating Federation
- Venue: Ondrej Nepela Arena

Champions
- Men's singles: (France) Kévin Aymoz
- Women's singles: (Italy) Lara Naki Gutmann
- Ice dance: (Spain) Olivia Smart & Tim Dieck
- Previous: 2024 CS Nepela Memorial
- Next: 2026 CS Nepela Memorial
- Previous CS: 2025 CS Nebelhorn Trophy
- Next CS: 2025 CS Denis Ten Memorial Challenge

The 2025 Nepela Memorial was a figure skating competition sanctioned by the International Skating Union (ISU), organized and hosted by the Slovak Figure Skating Federation, and the sixth event of the 2025–26 ISU Challenger Series. It was held at the Ondrej Nepela Arena in Bratislava, Slovakia, from 26 to 27 September 2025. Medals were awarded in men's singles, women's singles, and ice dance, and skaters earned ISU World Standing points based on their results. Kévin Aymoz of France won the men's event, Lara Naki Gutmann of Italy won the women's event, and Olivia Smart and Tim Dieck of Spain won the ice dance event.

== Background ==
The Nepela Memorial is named in honor of Ondrej Nepela, a Slovak figure skater who competed internationally for Czechoslovakia. He was the 1972 Olympic gold medalist, three-time World champion (1971–73), five-time European champion (1969–73), eight-time Czechoslovak national champion (1965–69, 1971–73), and the Slovak athlete of the 20th century.

The ISU Challenger Series was introduced in 2014. It is a series of international figure skating competitions sanctioned by the International Skating Union (ISU) and organized by ISU member nations. The objective was to ensure consistent organization and structure within a series of international competitions linked together, providing opportunities for senior-level skaters to compete at the international level and also earn ISU World Standing points. The 2025–26 Challenger Series consisted of eleven events, of which the Nepela Memorial was the sixth.

== Changes in preliminary assignments ==
The International Skating Union published the preliminary list of entrants on 2 September 2025.

Discipline	Withdrew			Ref.
Discipline	Date	Country	Skater(s)	Ref.
Ice dance	15 September	Switzerland	Gina Zehnder; Beda Leon Sieber	
Men	16 September	United States	Camden Pulkinen	
Ice dance	18 September	Italy	Noemi Maria Tali; Noah Lafornara	
Ice dance	24 September	Finland	Juulia Turkkila; Matthias Versluis	
Ice dance	24 September	Germany	Charise Matthaei; Max Liebers	
Men	24 September	Hungary	Aleksandr Vlasenko	

== Required performance elements ==
=== Single skating ===
Men and women competing in single skating first performed their short programs on Friday, 26 September. Lasting no more than 2 minutes 40 seconds, the short program had to include the following elements:

For men: one double or triple Axel; one triple or quadruple jump; one jump combination consisting of a double jump and a triple jump, two triple jumps, or a quadruple jump and a double jump or triple jump; one flying spin; one camel spin or sit spin with a change of foot; one spin combination with a change of foot; and a step sequence using the full ice surface.

For women: one double or triple Axel; one triple jump; one jump combination consisting of a double jump and a triple jump, or two triple jumps; one flying spin; one layback spin, sideways leaning spin, camel spin, or sit spin without a change of foot; one spin combination with a change of foot; and one step sequence using the full ice surface.

Men and women performed their free skates on Saturday, 27 September. The free skate performance for both men and women could last no more than 4 minutes, and had to include the following: seven jump elements, of which one had to be an Axel-type jump; three spins, of which one had to be a spin combination, one had to be a flying spin, and one had to be a spin with only one position; a step sequence; and a choreographic sequence.

=== Ice dance ===
Couples competing in ice dance performed their rhythm dances on Friday, 26 September. Lasting no more than 2 minutes 50 seconds, the theme of the rhythm dance this season was "music, dance styles, and feeling of the 1990s". Examples of applicable dance styles and music included, but were not limited to: pop, Latin, house, techno, hip-hop, and grunge. The rhythm dance had to include the following elements: one pattern dance step sequence, one choreographic rhythm sequence, one dance lift, one set of sequential twizzles, and one step sequence.

Couples then performed their free dances on Saturday, September2 7. The free dance could last no longer than 4 minutes, and had to include the following: three dance lifts, one dance spin, one set of synchronized twizzles, one step sequence in hold, one step sequence while on one skate and not touching, and three choreographic elements.

== Judging ==
Skaters were judged according to the required technical elements of their program (such as jumps and spins), as well as the overall presentation of their program, based on three program components (skating skills, presentation, and composition). Each technical element in a figure skating performance was assigned a predetermined base point value and scored by a panel of nine judges on a scale from −5 to +5 based on the quality of its execution. Each Grade of Execution (GOE) from –5 to +5 was assigned a value as indicated on the Scale of Values. For example, a triple Axel was worth a base value of 8.00 points, and a GOE of +3 was worth 2.40 points, so a triple Axel with a GOE of +3 earned 10.40 points. The judging panel's GOE for each element was determined by calculating the trimmed mean (the average after discarding the highest and lowest scores). The panel's scores for all elements were added together to generate a Total Elements Score. At the same time, the judges evaluated each performance based on the five aforementioned program components and assigned each a score from 0.25 to 10 in 0.25-point increments. The judging panel's final score for each program component was also determined by calculating the trimmed mean. Those scores were then multiplied by the factor shown on the chart below; the results were added together to generate a total Program Component Score.

Program component factoring
Discipline	Short program or Rhythm dance	Free skate or Free dance
Men	1.67	3.33
Women	1.33	2.67
Ice dance	1.33	2.00

Deductions were applied for certain violations, such as time infractions, stops and restarts, or falls. The Total Elements Score and Program Component Score were then added together, minus any deductions, to generate a final performance score for each skater or team.

== Medal summary ==
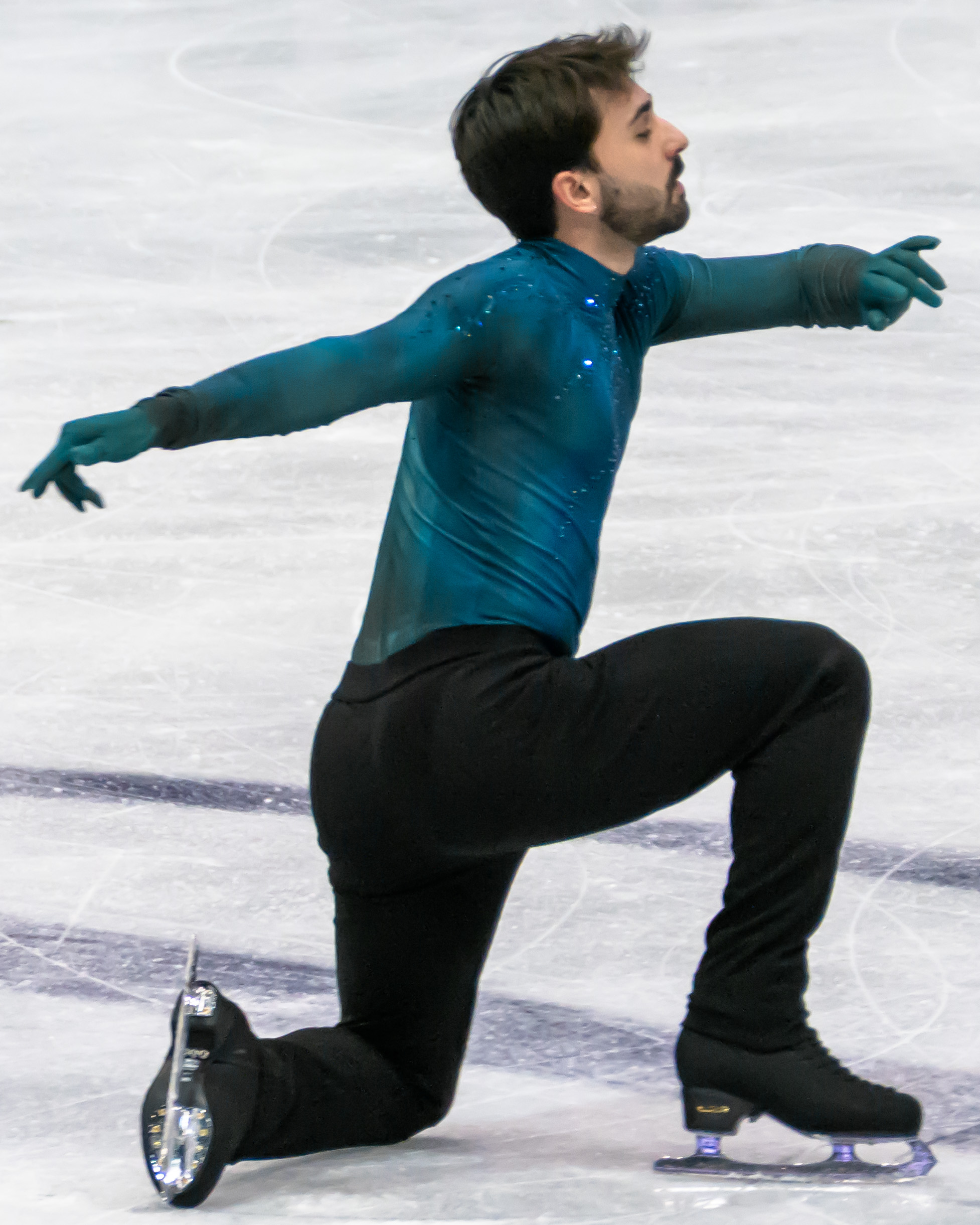
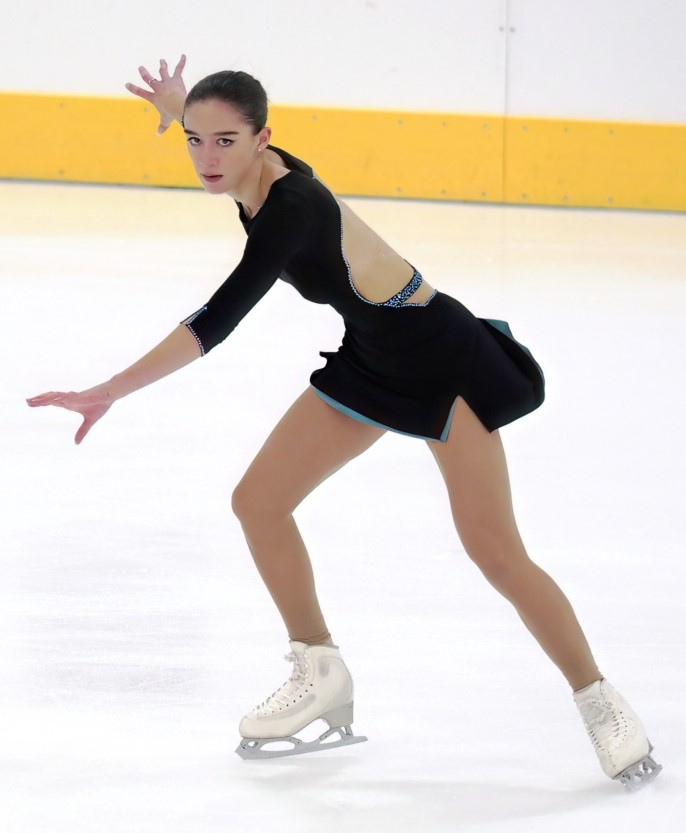
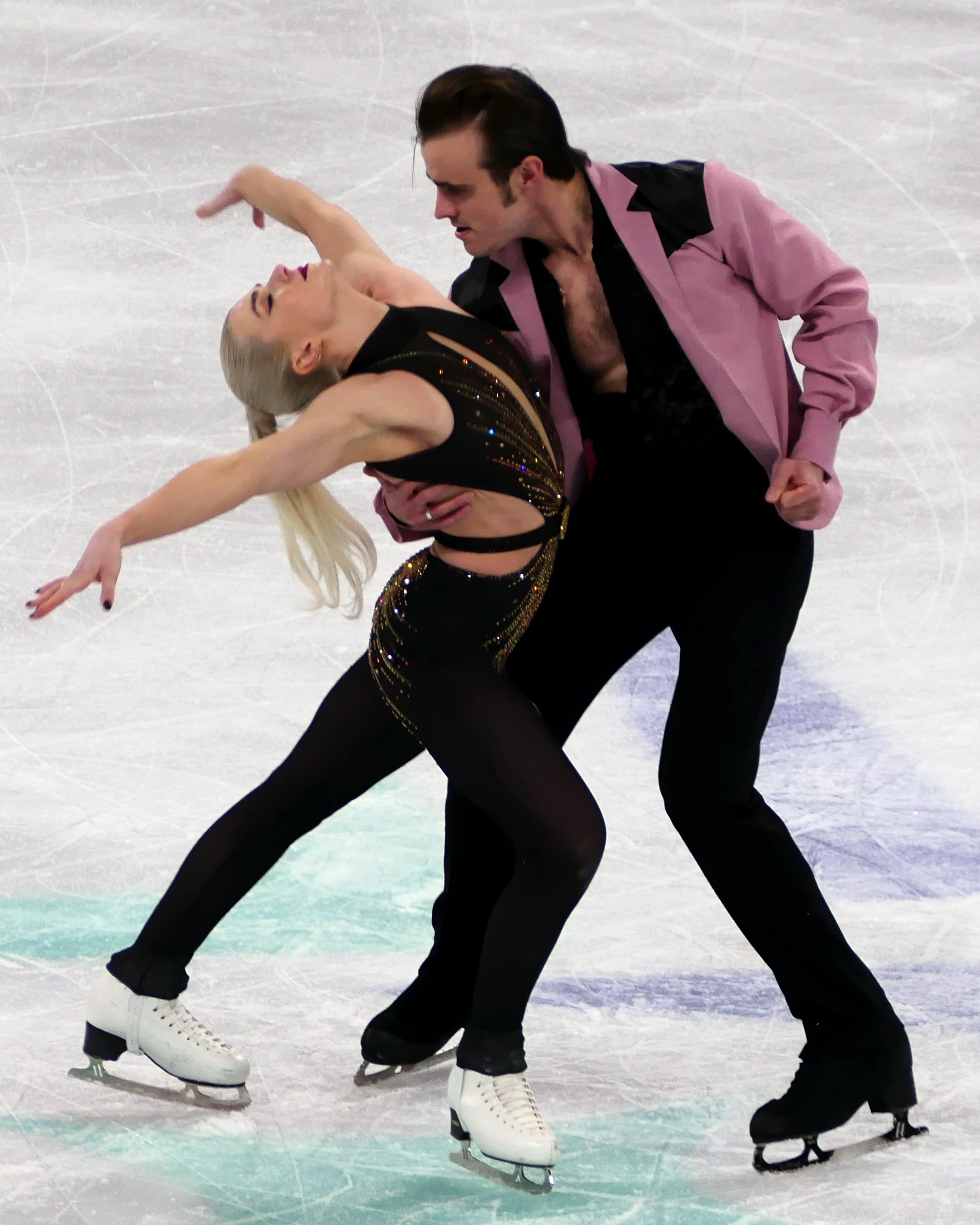
The 2025 Nepela Memorial champions: Kévin Aymoz of France (men's singles); Lara Naki Gutmann of Italy (women's singles); and Olivia Smart and Tim Dieck of Spain (ice dance)

Medalists
Discipline	Gold	Silver	Bronze
Men	(France) Kévin Aymoz	(Italy) Matteo Rizzo	(Italy) Daniel Grassl
Women	(Italy) Lara Naki Gutmann	(Italy) Anna Pezzetta	(Italy) Sarina Joos
Ice dance	(Spain); Olivia Smart; Tim Dieck	(Czech Republic); Natálie Taschlerová; Filip Taschler	(United States); Caroline Green; Michael Parsons

== Results ==
=== Men's singles ===
Men's results
Rank	Skater	Nation	Total points	SP		FS	
1st place, gold medalist(s)	Kévin Aymoz	France	261.90	1	93.49	1	168.41
2nd place, silver medalist(s)	Matteo Rizzo	Italy	249.46	4	82.52	2	166.94
3rd place, bronze medalist(s)	Daniel Grassl	Italy	241.81	2	85.89	3	155.92
4	Mihhail Selevko	Estonia	229.20	6	77.75	4	151.45
5	Adam Hagara	Slovakia	223.16	9	71.77	5	151.39
6	Jacob Sanchez	United States	223.14	3	83.97	9	139.17
7	Vladimir Samoilov	Poland	221.87	7	76.22	6	145.65
8	Nikolaj Memola	Italy	220.05	5	79.63	8	140.42
9	Cha Young-hyun	South Korea	212.82	11	71.73	7	141.09
10	Aleksa Rakic	Canada	210.91	10	71.76	10	139.15
11	Jari Kessler	Croatia	210.81	8	74.48	12	136.33
12	Tomàs-Llorenç Guarino Sabaté	Spain	208.69	12	71.65	11	137.04
13	Samy Hammi	France	199.31	13	68.04	14	131.27
14	Nikita Starostin	Germany	194.57	18	61.74	13	132.83
15	Lukáš Václavík	Slovakia	180.79	19	57.14	15	123.65
16	Tobia Oellerer	Austria	178.24	15	65.35	18	112.89
17	Xavier Vauclin	France	177.15	14	67.44	19	109.71
18	Jakub Lofek	Poland	176.89	17	63.14	17	113.75
19	Vadym Novikov	Ukraine	160.64	21	46.80	16	113.84
20	Casper Johansson	Sweden	158.52	20	56.29	20	102.23
21	Hugo Bostedt	Sweden	157.70	16	63.20	22	94.50
22	Euken Alberdi	Spain	141.55	23	44.35	21	97.20
23	Jozef Curma	Slovakia	122.73	22	45.09	23	77.64

=== Women's singles ===
Women's results
Rank	Skater	Nation	Total points	SP		FS	
1st place, gold medalist(s)	Lara Naki Gutmann	Italy	202.51	1	67.25	1	135.26
2nd place, silver medalist(s)	Anna Pezzetta	Italy	192.97	2	66.78	2	126.19
3rd place, bronze medalist(s)	Sarina Joos	Italy	180.36	5	59.85	4	120.51
4	Mariia Seniuk	Israel	178.92	7	58.33	3	120.59
5	Sara-Maude Dupuis	Canada	178.77	3	64.16	6	114.61
6	Lorine Schild	France	175.48	6	59.01	5	116.47
7	Starr Andrews	United States	167.24	4	60.67	8	106.57
8	Niina Petrõkina	Estonia	162.32	16	49.10	7	113.22
9	Nataly Langerbaur	Estonia	156.22	12	53.11	9	103.11
10	Vanesa Šelmeková	Slovakia	155.16	9	56.34	11	98.82
11	Elyce Lin-Gracey	United States	154.03	13	52.34	10	101.69
12	Kim Chae-yeon	South Korea	148.96	8	56.88	14	92.08
13	Aleksandra Dolinskė	Lithuania	144.24	18	48.43	12	95.81
14	Elizabet Gervits	Israel	141.94	11	54.96	16	86.98
15	Julia Van Dijk	Netherlands	140.49	14	51.14	15	89.35
16	Ava Marie Ziegler	United States	140.27	10	55.80	18	84.47
17	Barbora Vranková	Czech Republic	138.32	19	44.91	13	93.41
18	Clemence Mayindu	France	135.62	15	50.80	17	84.82
19	Nina Povey	Great Britain	130.93	17	48.48	19	82.45
20	Sadie Weng	Chinese Taipei	114.44	20	40.89	20	73.55
21	Ana Sofia Beschea	Romania	103.42	22	36.65	21	66.77
22	Julia Fennell	Israel	94.22	23	32.22	22	62.00
WD	Jade Hovine	Belgium	Withdrew	21	38.19	Withdrew from competition	

=== Ice dance ===
Ice dance results
Rank	Team	Nation	Total points	RD		FD	
1st place, gold medalist(s)	Olivia Smart; Tim Dieck	Spain	192.67	2	74.44	1	118.23
2nd place, silver medalist(s)	Natálie Taschlerová; Filip Taschler	Czech Republic	186.60	1	76.55	5	110.05
3rd place, bronze medalist(s)	Caroline Green; Michael Parsons	United States	184.18	7	71.77	2	112.41
4	Evgeniia Lopareva; Geoffrey Brissaud	France	183.40	4	72.09	3	111.31
5	Loïcia Demougeot; Théo le Mercier	France	183.05	3	72.72	4	110.33
6	Yuka Orihara; Juho Pirinen	Finland	173.90	6	71.78	6	102.12
7	Katarina Wolfkostin; Dimitry Tsarevski	United States	172.44	5	72.08	7	100.36
8	Célina Fradji; Jean-Hans Fourneaux	France	163.60	8	65.18	8	98.42
9	Zofia Grzegorzewska; Oleg Muratov	Poland	144.00	9	57.32	9	86.68
10	Chelsea Verhaegh; Sherim van Geffen	Netherlands	140.28	10	54.07	10	86.21
11	Emese Csiszér; Mark Shapiro	Hungary	129.54	12	48.18	11	81.36
12	Emilia Ziobrowska; Shiloh Judd	Romania	125.66	11	50.37	12	75.29

== Works cited ==
- "Special Regulations & Technical Rules – Single & Pair Skating and Ice Dance 2024" (PDF). International Skating Union. Archived (PDF) from the original on 3 June 2025.
