= Dimitry Tsarevski =

American ice dancer (born 2003)

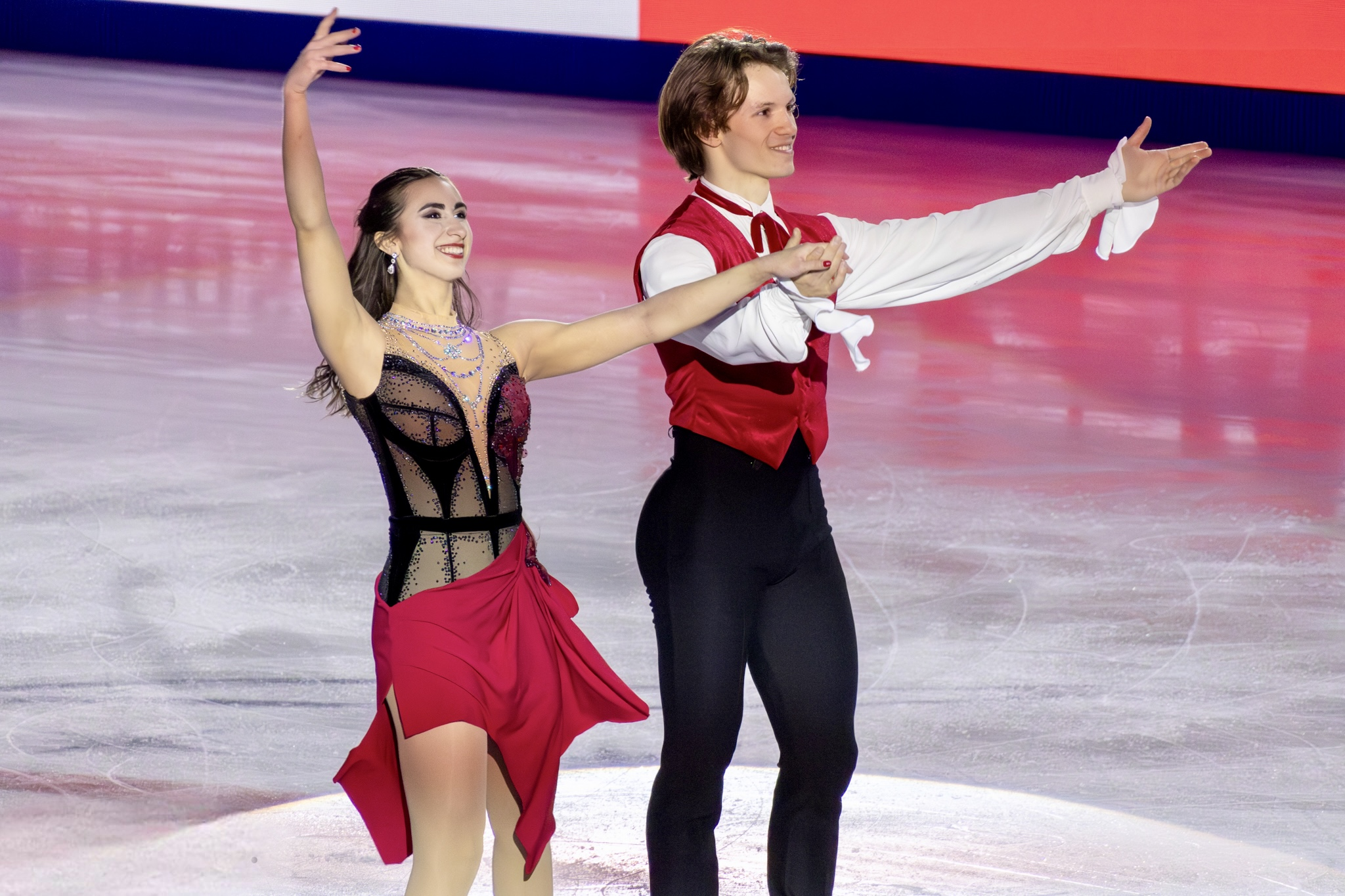
- Katarina Wolfkostin and Dimitry Tsarevski at the 2024–25 Junior Grand Prix Final

Personal information
- Born: August 7, 2003 (age 23) Denver, Colorado, U.S.
- Height: 6 ft 0 in (1.83 m)

Figure skating career
- Country: United States
- Discipline: Ice dance
- Partner: Katarina Wolfkostin (since 2023); Isabella Flores (2020–21); Leah Neset (2018–19)
- Coach: Tanith White; Greg Zuerlein; Brooke O'Keefe
- Skating club: Peninsula Skating Club
- Began skating: 2016

Medal record
World Junior Championships
Silver medal – second place	2025 Debrecen	Ice dance
Junior Grand Prix Final
Silver medal – second place	2024–25 Grenoble	Ice dance

Dimitry Tsarevski (born August 7, 2003) is an American ice dancer. Together with his partner Katarina Wolfkostin, he is the 2025 CS Lombardia Trophy bronze medalist.

On the junior level, they are the 2025 World Junior silver medalists, 2024–25 Junior Grand Prix Final silver medalist, the 2024 JGP Poland champions, and the 2024 JGP Czech Republic silver medalists.

With his former skating partner, Isabella Flores, he was the 2021 JGP France II and 2021 JGP Poland silver medalist, and the 2021 U.S. junior national pewter medalist.

== Personal life ==
Tsarevski was born on August 7, 2003 in Denver, Colorado, United States.

In addition to figure skating, he also enjoys music, cartography, reading, and writing.

== Career ==
=== Early career ===
Tsarevski began ice skating when he was seven, when his parents signed him up for hockey. Two years later, he joined his sisters when they began figure skating. He started ice dancing when he was thirteen. He competed with Leah Neset from 2018 to 2019. At the 2019 U.S. Figure Skating Championships, they won the silver medal in the intermediate division. He then competed with Isabella Flores from 2020 to 2021. Due to the COVID-19 pandemic they competed in a virtual event, placing third in the U.S. junior series. They subsequently placed fourth at the 2021 U.S. Junior Championships.

=== 2021–22 season: Junior international debut ===
Flores and Tsarevski placed first in Lake Placid in the junior division, and were assigned to two ISU Junior Grand Prix competitions. They placed second at both events, the 2021 JGP France II and the 2021 JGP Poland. Following this, they won the domestic competition for the U.S. junior championship series. Their partnership ended in December 2021, prior to the U.S. junior national championships in January.

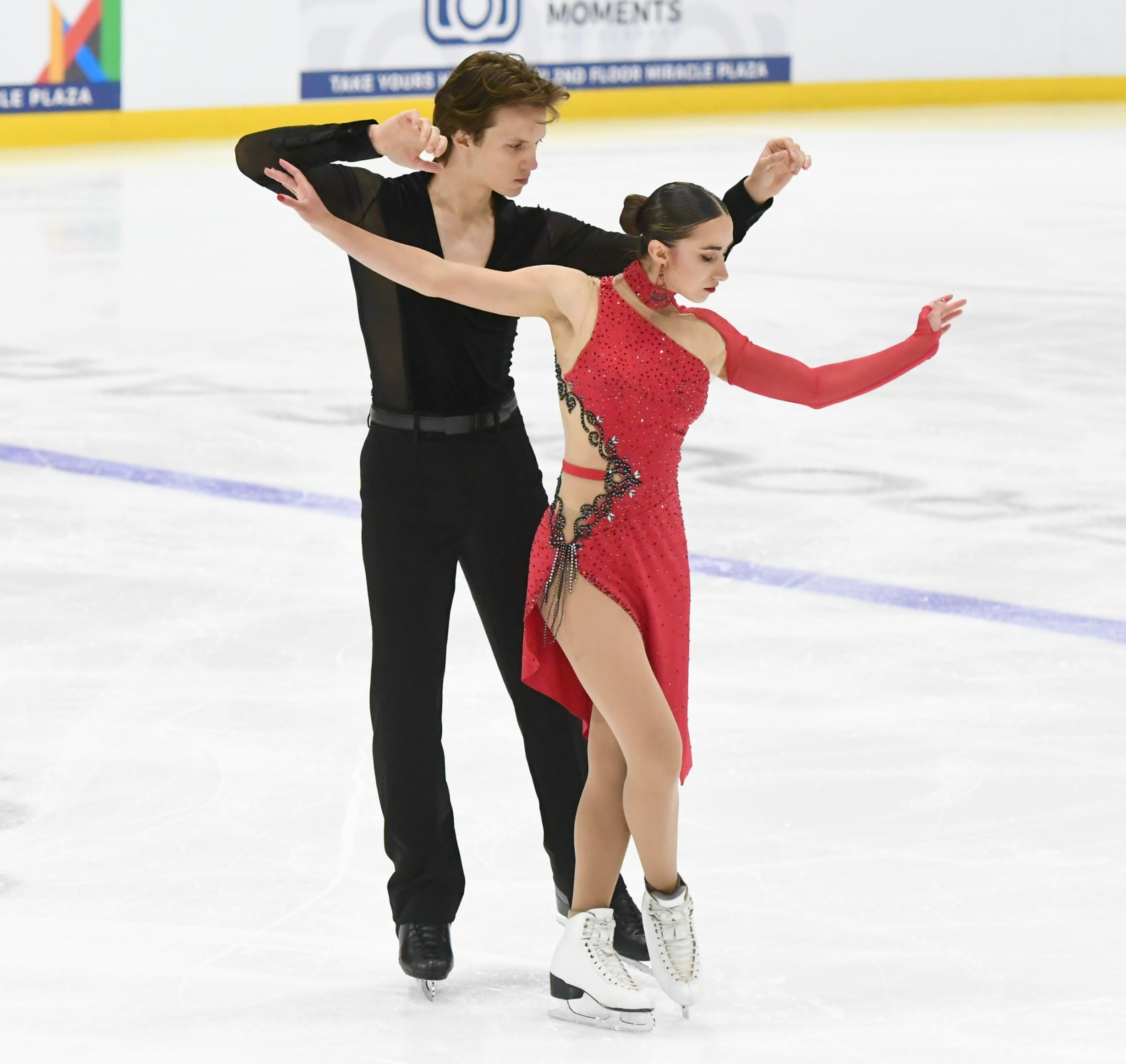
Wolfkostin/Tsarevski at the 2023 Lake Placid Ice Dance Championships

=== 2023–24 season: First season with Wolfkostin ===
On May 16, 2023, Tsarevski and Wolfkostin announced their new ice dance partnership. In subsequent interviews, Tsarevski confirmed that he had taken a break and had now moved from Colorado to Michigan to train with Wolfkostin and coaches Charlie White, Greg Zuerlein, and Tanith Belbin White. Wolfkostin/Tsarevski started their season with successful summer competitions in Dallas and Lake Placid, where they placed first in all events at the senior level. They were then given their first senior international assignment, the 2023 CS Autumn Classic International, where they placed fifth. They again placed fifth at the 2023 CS Budapest Trophy. The following month, they placed first in both segments of the senior level of the 2024 U.S. Ice Dance Final, easily winning the gold and qualifying them for the 2024 U.S. Championships. There, they placed eighth in the rhythm dance, seventh in the free dance, and ninth overall, finishing 1.38 points behind sibling team Brown/Brown.

=== 2024–2025 season: World Junior silver and Junior Grand Prix Final silver ===
In June 2024, a new ruling of the ISU Congress resulted in a change of age limit for junior pairs and ice dance teams, and Wolfkostin, 19, and Tsarevski, 20, opted to start the year in the junior division. Wolfkostin had reported being off the ice for several months while recovering from a leg fracture, and they waited until July to begin their season. At the 2024 Lake Placid Ice Dance International, they placed second overall. They were then assigned to the JGP Czech Republic, where they clinched the silver medal. A few weeks later at the JGP Poland, they won the gold medal, scoring new season's bests and qualifying them for the Junior Grand Prix Final in Grenoble, France. There, Wolfkostin/Tsarevski scored 65.57 in the rhythm dance and 99.41 in the free, totaling 164.98 points and earning the silver medal in the final.

Competing a "split" junior-senior season, after the conclusion of the Grand Prix, Wolfkostin and Tsarevski skated to brand new senior programs for the 2025 U.S. Championships. There, they placed sixth in the rhythm dance with a score of 76.27, and eighth in the free with a score of 110.56, for a total of 186.83 points and a seventh-place finish overall.

Following the national championships, Wolfkostin/Tsarevski were assigned to complete their season at the 2025 World Junior Championships in Debrecen. Despite skating early in the rhythm dance segment, the team scored 65.71 points and placed second. They then scored 101.80 in the free dance, earning a combined total of 167.51 points, and ultimately winning the silver medal, behind Italian team Tali/Lafornara.

Wolfkostin/Tsarevski at the 2026 U.S. Championships

=== 2025–2026 season: Grand Prix senior debut ===
Wolfkostin/Tsarevski opened the season by competing on the 2025–26 Challenger Series, winning bronze at the 2025 CS Lombardia Trophy and placing seventh at the 2025 CS Nepela Memorial. They then went on to make their senior Grand Prix debut at the 2025 NHK Trophy. There, they placed fifth in both the rhythm and the free dance, and fifth overall, notably beating former Olympians Maia and Alex Shibutani. In January, Wolfkostin/Tsarevski competed at the 2026 U.S. Championships, finishing in seventh place overall.

=== 2026–2027 season ===
Wolfkostin/Tsarevski opened their season by placing 11th at the 2026 Kinoshita Group Cup.

== Programs ==
=== Ice dance with Katarina Wolfkostin ===
Season	Rhythm dance	Free dance
2023–2024	Love Is a Battlefield by Pat Benatar; Call Me by Blondie choreo. by Charlie White, Greg Zuerlein, Tanith White	Tanguera by Diego Schissi Quinteto; Invierno Porteño by Astor Piazzolla performed by Gidon Kremer & Kremerata Baltica choreo. by Charlie White, Greg Zuerlein, Tanith White
2024–2025	Car Wash by Norman Whitfield performed by Christina Aguilera; Disco Inferno by The Trammps, Ron Kersey, & Leroy Green choreo. by Charlie White, Greg Zuerlein, Tanith White	Moulin Rouge!; One Day I'll Fly Away performed by Nicole Kidman; The Show Must Go On performed by Nicole Kidman, Jim Broadbent, & Anthony Weigh choreo. by Charlie White, Greg Zuerlein, Tanith White
2025–2026	Everybody (Backstreet's Back) (Extended Version) by Backstreet Boys; Quit Playing Games (with My Heart) (Remix) by Backstreet Boys & Bodybangers; Larger Than Life by Backstreet Boys choreo. by Charlie White, Tanith White, Greg Zuerlein, Krisilyn Frazier	Bang Bang (My Baby Shot Me Down) by Nancy Sinatra; Battle Without Honor or Humanity by Tomoyasu Hotei & Yoichi Murata; The Lonely Shepherd by Gheorghe Zamfir & James Last; Malagueña by Ernesto Lecuona choreo. by Charlie White, Tanith White, Greg Zuerlein, Krisilyn Frazier

=== Ice dance with Isabella Flores ===
Season	Short program	Free skating
2020–2021	I'd Rather Be Blue; Don't Rain on My Parade (from Funny Girl) performed by Barbra Streisand choreo. by Christopher Dean	Tangomania by Aldo Maietti e la sua Orchestra; Oblivion by Astor Piazzolla performed by Gidon Kremer choreo. by Christopher Dean
2021–2022	Blues: Oh, What a Night for Dancing by Barry White; Funk: Perm by Bruno Mars choreo. by Joel Dear	Nuvole Bianche by Ludovico Einaudi; Earth Song by Michael Jackson choreo. by Joel Dear

== Competitive highlights ==
- GP – Event of the ISU Grand Prix Series
- JGP – Event of the ISU Junior Grand Prix Series
- CS – Event of the ISU Challenger Series
- TBD – Assigned
- WD – Withdrew from competition

=== Ice dance with Katarina Wolfkostin ===
Competition placements at senior level
Season	2023–24	2024–25	2025–26	2026–27
U.S. Championships	9th	7th	7th	
GP NHK Trophy			5th	
GP Skate America				4th
GP Skate Canada				6th
CS Autumn Classic	5th			
CS Budapest Trophy	5th			
CS Kinoshita Group Cup				11th
CS Lombardia Trophy			3rd	
CS Nebelhorn Trophy				6th
CS Nepela Memorial			7th	
CS Tallinn Trophy		WD		

Competition placements at junior level
Season	2024–25
World Junior Championships	2nd
Junior Grand Prix Final	2nd
JGP Czech Republic	2nd
JGP Poland	1st
Lake Placid Ice Dance	2nd

=== Ice dance with Isabella Flores ===
Competition placements at junior level
Season	2020–21	2021–22
U.S. Championships	4th	
JGP France II		2nd
JGP Poland		2nd
Lake Placid Ice Dance		1st

== Detailed results ==
=== Ice dance with Katarina Wolfkostin ===
ISU personal best scores in the +5/-5 GOE System
Segment	Type	Score	Event
Total	TSS	182.85	2025 NHK Trophy
Rhythm dance	TSS	72.12	2025 NHK Trophy
Rhythm dance	TES	41.42	2026 Skate Canada International
Rhythm dance	PCS	31.79	2025 CS Nepela Memorial
Free dance	TSS	110.73	2025 NHK Trophy
Free dance	TES	62.27	2025 CS Lombardia Trophy
Free dance	PCS	48.58	2025 NHK Trophy

==== Senior level ====
Results in the 2023–24 season
Date	Event	RD		FD		Total	
Date	Event	P	Score	P	Score	P	Score
Sep 14–17, 2023	(Canada) 2023 CS Autumn Classic International	5	66.43	4	96.91	5	163.34
Oct 13–15, 2023	(Hungary) 2023 CS Budapest Trophy	5	68.92	5	103.96	5	172.88
Jan 22–28, 2024	(United States) 2024 U.S. Championships	8	70.40	7	107.65	9	178.05

Results in the 2024–25 season
Date	Event	RD		FD		Total	
Date	Event	P	Score	P	Score	P	Score
Nov 12–17, 2024	(Estonia) 2024 CS Tallinn Trophy	6	69.28	–	–	–	WD
Jan 20–26, 2025	(United States) 2025 U.S. Championships	6	76.27	8	110.56	7	186.83

Results in the 2025–26 season
Date	Event	RD		FD		Total	
Date	Event	P	Score	P	Score	P	Score
Sep 11–14, 2025	(Italy) 2025 CS Lombardia Trophy	3	69.73	2	110.47	3	180.20
Sep 25–27, 2025	(Slovakia) 2025 CS Nepela Memorial	5	72.08	7	100.36	7	172.44
Nov 7–9, 2025	(Japan) 2025 NHK Trophy	5	72.12	4	110.73	5	182.85
Jan 4–11, 2026	(United States) 2026 U.S. Championships	7	74.99	7	111.61	7	186.60

Results in the 2026–27 season
Date	Event	SP		FS		Total	
Date	Event	P	Score	P	Score	P	Score
Sep 4–6, 2026	(Japan) 2026 CS Kinoshita Group Cup	12	54.31	7	98.53	11	152.84
Sep 24–26, 2026	(Germany) 2026 CS Nebelhorn Trophy	3	68.33	6	99.32	6	167.65
Oct 30 – Nov 1, 2026	2026 Skate Canada International	6	71.40	6	104.24	6	175.64
Nov 13–15, 2026	(United States) 2026 Skate America	5	69.62	4	107.41	4	177.03

==== Junior level ====
Results in the 2024–25 season
Date	Event	RD		FD		Total	
Date	Event	P	Score	P	Score	P	Score
Jul 30–31, 2024	(United States) 2024 Lake Placid Ice Dance International	3	57.03	2	92.71	2	149.74
Sep 4–7, 2024	2024 JGP Czech Republic	2	55.98	3	88.96	2	144.94
Sep 25–28, 2024	2024 JGP Poland	1	65.85	1	101.03	1	166.88
Dec 5–8, 2024	(France) 2024–25 Junior Grand Prix Final	2	65.57	2	99.41	2	164.98
Feb 25 – Mar 2, 2025	(Hungary) 2025 World Junior Championships	2	65.71	2	101.80	2	167.51

=== Ice dance with Isabella Flores ===
Results in the 2020–21 season
Date	Event	RD		FD		Total	
Date	Event	P	Score	P	Score	P	Score
Jan 11–21, 2021	(United States) 2021 U.S. Championships (Junior)	4	59.98	4	86.42	4	146.40

Results in the 2021–22 season
Date	Event	RD		FD		Total	
Date	Event	P	Score	P	Score	P	Score
Aug 12–15, 2021	(United States) 2021 Lake Placid Ice Dance	1	60.28	1	90.81	1	151.09
Aug 25–28, 2021	2021 JGP France II	1	60.56	2	92.51	2	153.07
Sep 29 – Oct 2, 2021	2021 JGP Poland	2	63.29	2	91.05	2	154.34
