= 2025 CS Kinoshita Group Cup =

Figure skating competition

- Type: ISU Challenger Series
- Date: September 5 – 7
- Season: 2025–26
- Location: Osaka, Japan
- Host: Japan Skating Federation
- Venue: Kanku Ice Arena

Champions
- Men's singles: (South Korea) Cha Jun-hwan
- Women's singles: (Japan) Mone Chiba
- Pairs: (Japan) Riku Miura and Ryuichi Kihara
- Ice dance: (Canada) Marie-Jade Lauriault and Romain Le Gac
- Next: 2026 CS Kinoshita Group Cup
- Previous CS: 2025 CS John Nicks International Pairs Competition
- Next CS: 2025 CS Lombardia Trophy

The 2025 Kinoshita Group Cup was a figure skating competition sanctioned by the International Skating Union (ISU), organized and hosted by the Japan Skating Federation, and the third event of the 2025–26 ISU Challenger Series. It was held at the Kanku Ice Arena in Osaka, Japan, from September 5 to 7, 2025. Medals were awarded in men's singles, women's singles, pair skating, and ice dance, and skaters earned ISU World Standing points based on their results. Cha Jun-hwan of South Korea won the men's event, Mone Chiba of Japan won the women's event, Riku Miura and Ryuichi Kihara of Japan won the pairs event, and Marie-Jade Lauriault and Romain Le Gac of Canada won the ice dance event.

== Background ==
The ISU Challenger Series was introduced in 2014. It is a series of international figure skating competitions sanctioned by the International Skating Union (ISU) and organized by ISU member nations. The objective was to ensure consistent organization and structure within a series of international competitions linked together, providing opportunities for senior-level skaters to compete at the international level and also earn ISU World Standing points. The 2025–26 Challenger Series consisted of eleven events, of which the Kinoshita Group Cup was the third. The 2025 Kinoshita Group Cup was held at the Kanku Ice Arena in Osaka, Japan, from September 5 to 7, 2025.

== Changes to preliminary assignments ==
The International Skating Union published the preliminary list of entrants on August 8, 2025.

Date	Discipline	Withdrew	Ref.
August 11	Pairs	(Armenia); Karina Akopova; Nikita Rakhmanin	
August 19	Pairs	(Australia); Anastasia Golubeva; Hektor Giotopoulos Moore	
August 19	Women	(Serbia); Antonina Dubinina	
August 23	Women	(South Korea); You Young	
August 26	Pairs	(Hungary); Maria Pavlova; Alexei Sviatchenko	
August 29	Pairs	(Canada); Kelly Ann Laurin; Loucas Éthier	
August 29	Women	(Cyprus); Stefania Yakovleva	

== Required performance elements ==
=== Single skating ===
Men and women competing in single skating first performed their short program on September 5. Lasting no more than 2 minutes 40 seconds, the short program had to include the following elements:

For men: one double or triple Axel; one triple or quadruple jump; one jump combination consisting of a double jump and a triple jump, two triple jumps, or a quadruple jump and a double jump or triple jump; one flying spin; one camel spin or sit spin with a change of foot; one spin combination with a change of foot; and a step sequence using the full ice surface.

For women: one double or triple Axel; one triple jump; one jump combination consisting of a double jump and a triple jump, or two triple jumps; one flying spin; one layback spin, sideways leaning spin, camel spin, or sit spin without a change of foot; one spin combination with a change of foot; and one step sequence using the full ice surface.

Women performed their free skates on September 6, while men performed theirs on September 7. The free skate for both men and women could last no more than 4 minutes, and had to include the following: seven jump elements, of which one had to be an Axel-type jump; three spins, of which one had to be a spin combination, one had to be a flying spin, and one had to be a spin with only one position; a step sequence; and a choreographic sequence.

=== Pairs ===
Couples competing in pair skating first performed their short program on September 6. Lasting no more than 2 minutes 40 seconds, the short program had to include the following elements: one pair lift, one double or triple twist lift, one double or triple throw jump, one double or triple solo jump, one solo spin combination with a change of foot, one death spiral, and a step sequence using the full ice surface.

Couples performed their free skates on September 6. The free skate could last no more than 4 minutes, and had to include the following: three pair lifts, of which one has to be a twist lift; two different throw jumps; one solo jump; one jump combination or sequence; one pair spin combination; one death spiral; and a choreographic sequence.

=== Ice dance ===
Couples competing in ice dance performed their rhythm dances on September 6. Lasting no more than 2 minutes 50 seconds, the theme of the rhythm dance this season was "music, dance styles, and feeling of the 1990s". Examples of applicable dance styles and music included: pop, Latin, house, techno, hip-hop, and grunge. The rhythm dance had to include the following elements: one pattern dance step sequence, one choreographic rhythm sequence, one dance lift, one set of sequential twizzles, and one step sequence.

Couples then performed their free dances on September 7. The free dance could last no longer than 4 minutes, and had to include the following: three dance lifts, one dance spin, one set of synchronized twizzles, one step sequence in hold, one step sequence while on one skate and not touching, and three choreographic elements.

== Judging ==
Skaters were judged according to the required technical elements of their program (such as jumps and spins), as well as the overall presentation of their program, based on three program components (skating skills, presentation, and composition). Each technical element in a figure skating performance was assigned a predetermined base point value and scored by a panel of nine judges on a scale from −5 to +5 based on the quality of its execution. Each Grade of Execution (GOE) from –5 to +5 was assigned a value as indicated on the Scale of Values. For example, a triple Axel was worth a base value of 8.00 points, and a GOE of +3 was worth 2.40 points, so a triple Axel with a GOE of +3 earned 10.40 points. The judging panel's GOE for each element was determined by calculating the trimmed mean (the average after discarding the highest and lowest scores). The panel's scores for all elements were added together to generate a Total Elements Score. At the same time, the judges evaluated each performance based on the five aforementioned program components and assigned each a score from 0.25 to 10 in 0.25-point increments. The judging panel's final score for each program component was also determined by calculating the trimmed mean. Those scores were then multiplied by the factor shown on the chart below; the results were added together to generate a total Program Component Score.

Program component factoring
Discipline	Short program or Rhythm dance	Free skate or Free dance
Men	1.67	3.33
Women	1.33	2.67
Pairs	1.33	2.67
Ice dance	1.33	2.00

Deductions were applied for certain violations, such as time infractions, stops and restarts, or falls. The Total Elements Score and Program Component Score were then added together, minus any deductions, to generate a final performance score for each skater or team.

== Medal summary ==
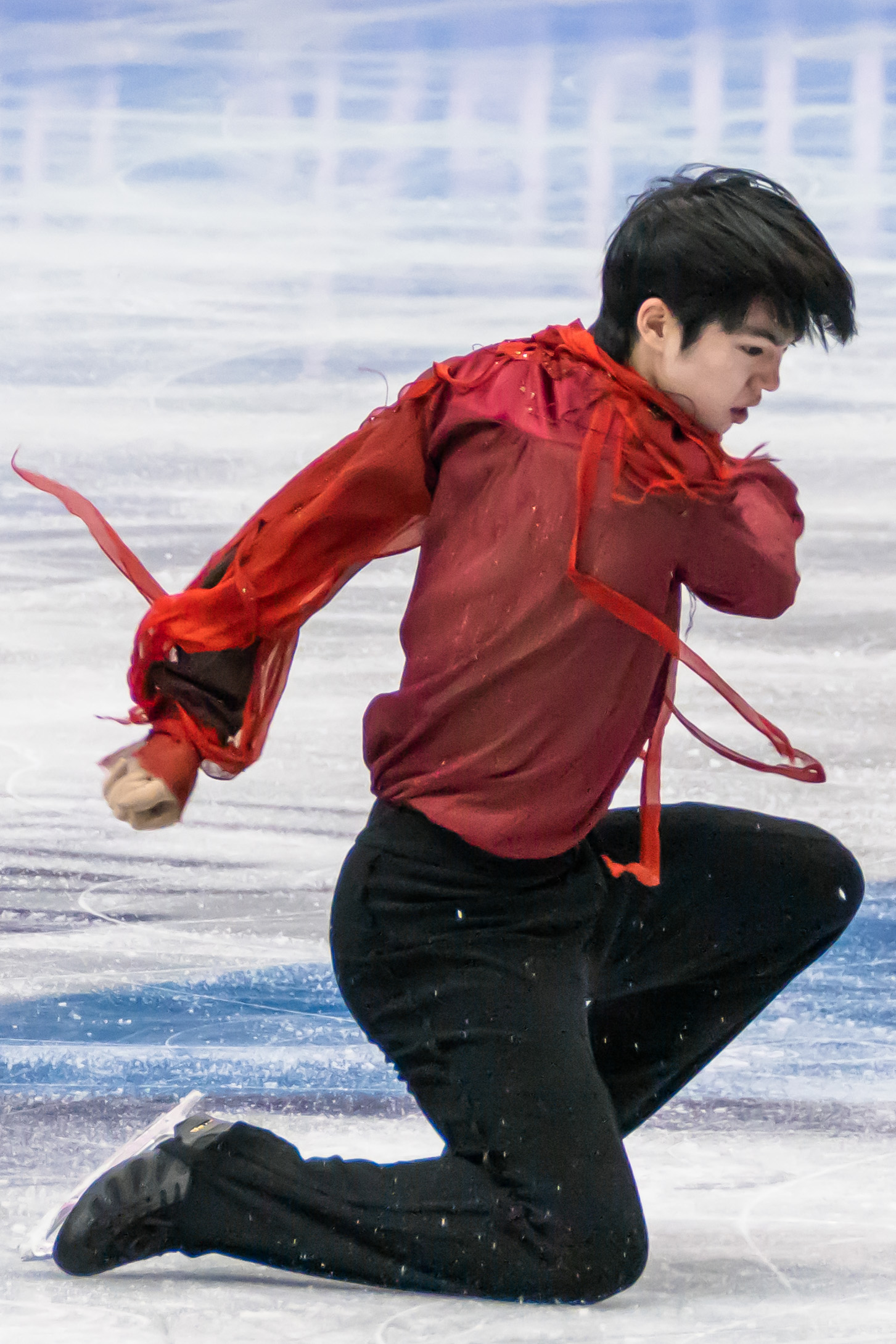
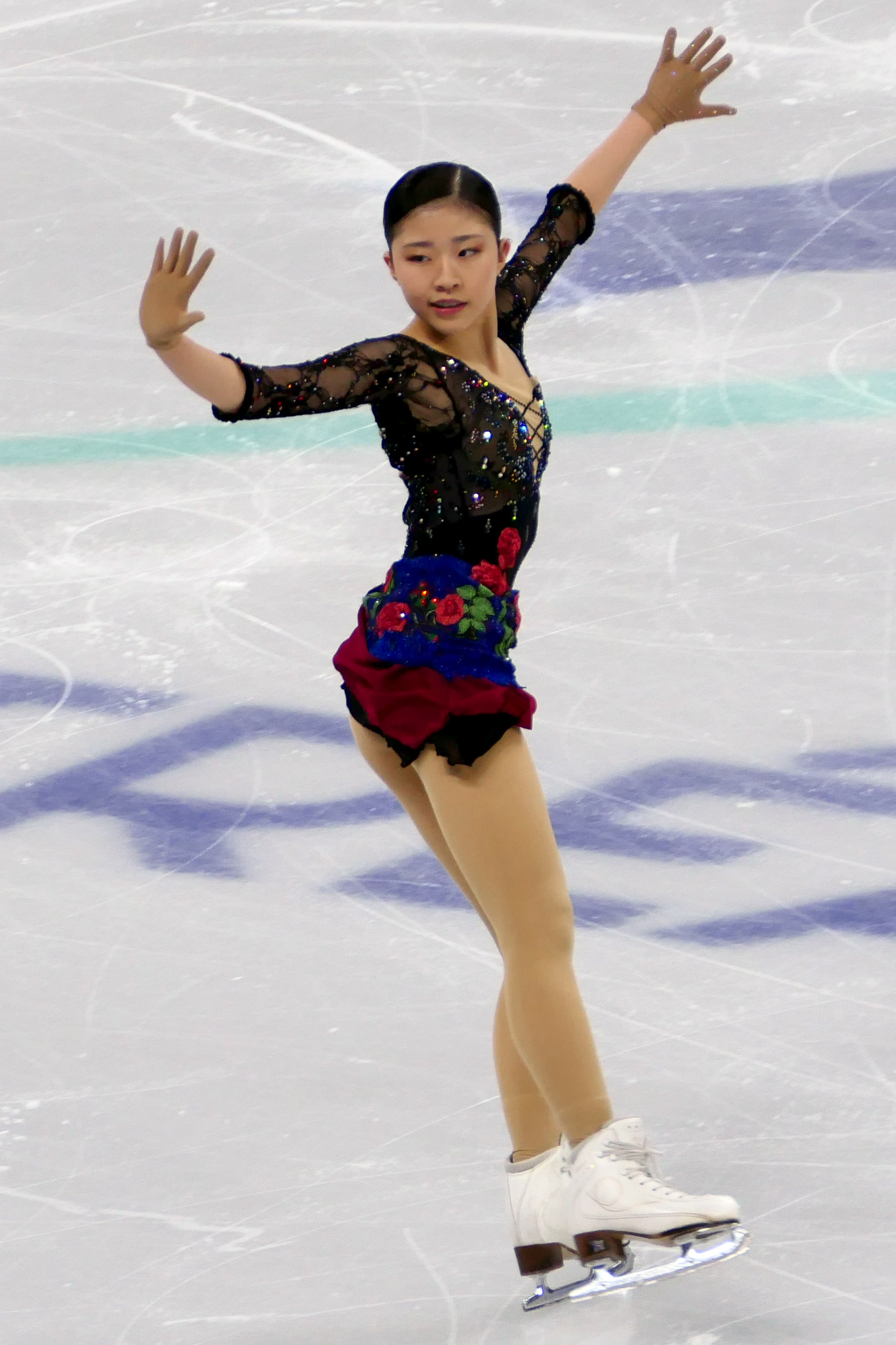
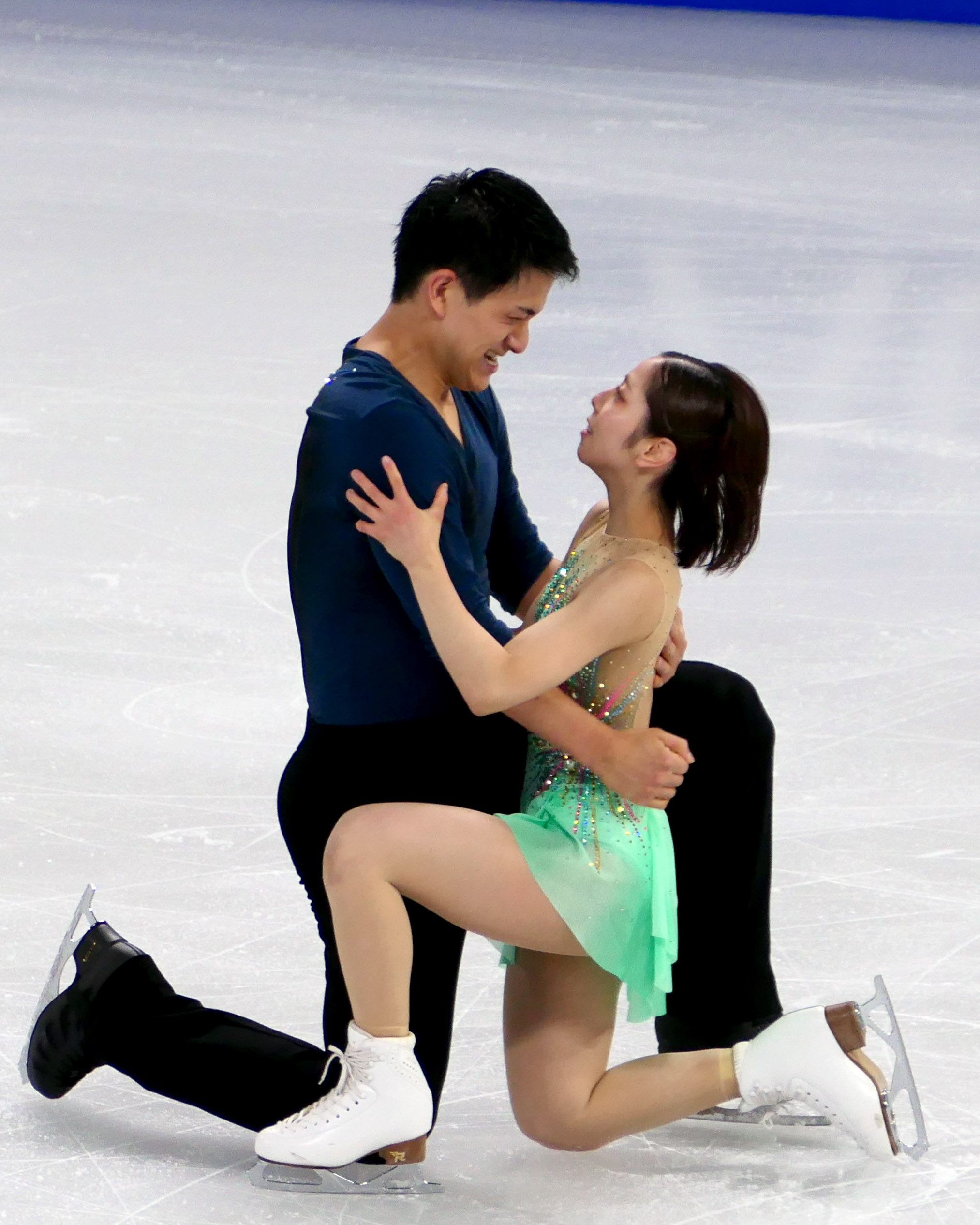
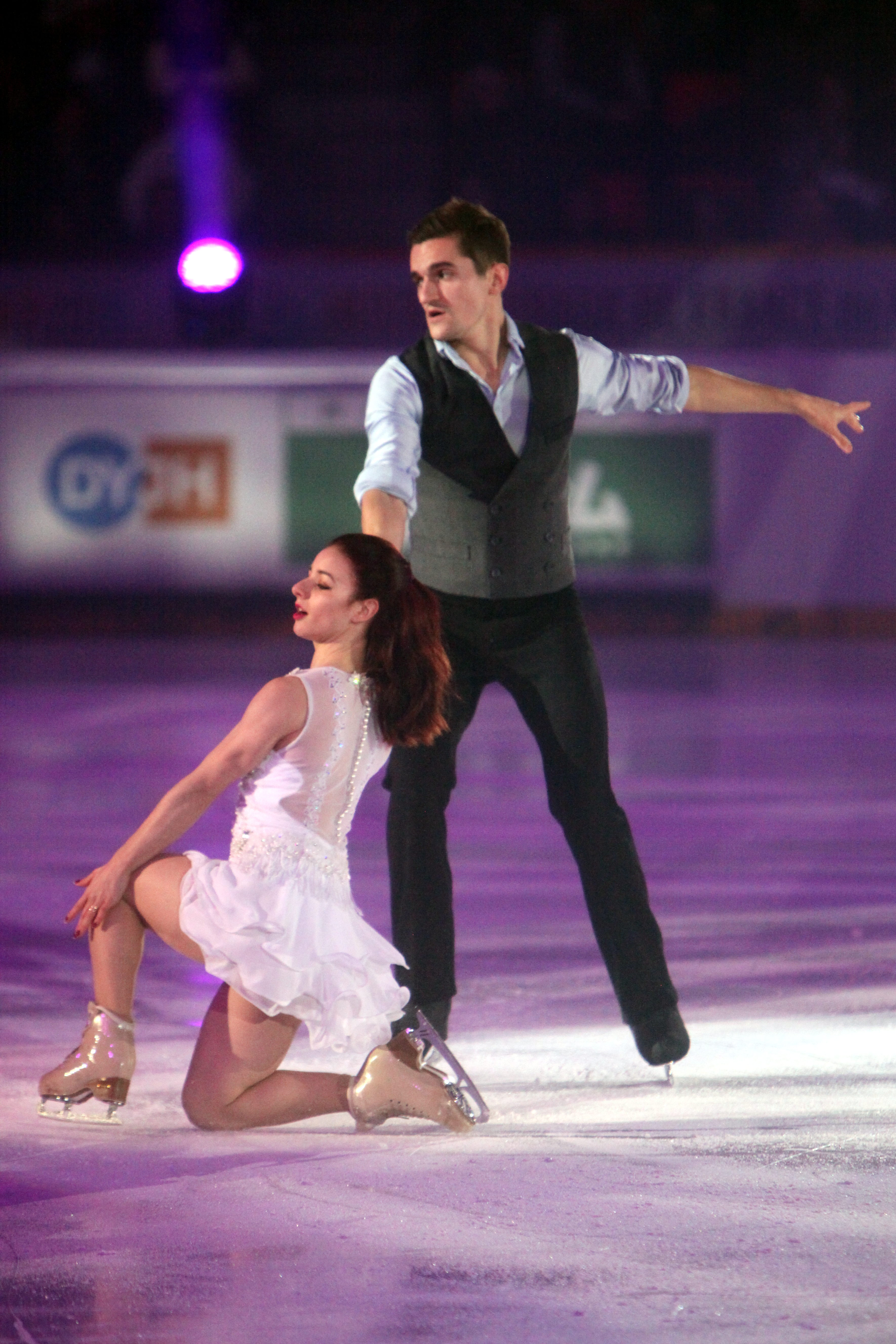
The 2025 Kinoshita Group Cup champions: Cha Jun-hwan of South Korea (men's singles); Mone Chiba of Japan (women's singles); Riku Miura and Ryuichi Kihara of Japan (pair skating); and Marie-Jade Lauriault and Romain Le Gac of Canada (ice dance)

Medalists
Discipline	Gold	Silver	Bronze
Men	(South Korea) Cha Jun-hwan	(Japan) Kazuki Tomono	(United States) Tomoki Hiwatashi
Women	(Japan) Mone Chiba	(Japan) Kaori Sakamoto	(Japan) Saki Miyake
Pairs	(Japan); Riku Miura; Ryuichi Kihara	(Georgia (country)); Anastasiia Metelkina; Luka Berulava	(Japan); Yuna Nagaoka; Sumitada Moriguchi
Ice dance	(Canada); Marie-Jade Lauriault; Romain Le Gac	(United States); Emilea Zingas; Vadym Kolesnik	(United States); Leah Neset; Artem Markelov

== Results ==
=== Men's singles ===
Men's results
Rank	Skater	Nation	Total	SP		FS	
1st place, gold medalist(s)	Cha Jun-hwan	South Korea	253.31	1	87.76	1	165.55
2nd place, silver medalist(s)	Kazuki Tomono	Japan	236.78	2	85.08	5	151.70
3rd place, bronze medalist(s)	Tomoki Hiwatashi	United States	236.71	4	83.62	3	153.09
4	Sōta Yamamoto	Japan	233.91	3	84.98	6	148.93
5	Tatsuya Tsuboi	Japan	231.19	9	79.82	4	152.37
6	Lee Jae-keun	South Korea	226.53	7	82.41	7	144.12
7	Aleksa Rakic	Canada	221.18	10	78.73	8	142.45
8	Kao Miura	Japan	219.17	6	82.49	10	136.68
9	Lee Si-hyeong	South Korea	218.56	13	62.86	2	155.70
10	Jimmy Ma	United States	218.52	5	83.52	11	135.00
11	Haru Kakiuchi	Japan	203.83	11	65.67	9	138.16
12	Goku Endo	United States	198.20	12	65.24	12	132.96
13	Shunsuke Nakamura	Japan	188.12	8	79.34	13	108.78
14	Tao MacRae	Great Britain	159.84	14	54.59	14	104.95

=== Women's singles ===
Women's results
Rank	Skater	Nation	Total	SP		FS	
1st place, gold medalist(s)	Mone Chiba	Japan	216.59	1	73.11	1	143.48
2nd place, silver medalist(s)	Kaori Sakamoto	Japan	203.54	4	65.25	2	138.29
3rd place, bronze medalist(s)	Saki Miyake	Japan	196.79	2	70.29	5	126.50
4	Rinka Watanabe	Japan	189.55	8	57.73	3	131.82
5	Bradie Tennell	United States	187.18	5	64.52	8	122.66
6	Mako Yamashita	Japan	183.81	12	52.40	4	131.41
7	Lee Hae-in	South Korea	183.48	7	59.39	7	124.09
8	Hana Yoshida	Japan	180.62	11	55.41	6	125.11
9	Yun Ah-sun	South Korea	173.51	9	57.35	9	116.16
10	Madeline Schizas	Canada	172.40	3	66.57	10	105.83
11	Wakaba Higuchi	Japan	159.13	6	59.43	11	99.70
12	Sonja Hilmer	United States	144.67	10	55.72	13	88.95
13	Eliška Březinová	Czech Republic	140.68	13	50.05	12	90.64
14	Maria Chernyshova	Australia	110.97	14	43.42	14	67.55

=== Pairs ===
Pairs' results
Rank	Team	Nation	Total points	SP		FS	
1st place, gold medalist(s)	Riku Miura; Ryuichi Kihara	Japan	222.94	1	79.94	1	143.00
2nd place, silver medalist(s)	Anastasiia Metelkina; Luka Berulava	Georgia	212.90	2	75.32	2	137.58
3rd place, bronze medalist(s)	Yuna Nagaoka; Sumitada Moriguchi	Japan	192.77	3	66.27	3	126.50
4	Valentina Plazas; Maximiliano Fernandez	United States	167.25	4	59.64	4	107.61
5	Daria Danilova; Michel Tsiba	Netherlands	158.24	5	56.47	5	101.77
6	Isabella Gamez; Alexander Korovin	Philippines	141.14	6	51.60	6	85.94

=== Ice dance ===
Ice dance results
Rank	Team	Nation	Total points	RD		FD	
1st place, gold medalist(s)	Marie-Jade Lauriault; Romain Le Gac	Canada	197.90	1	76.40	1	121.50
2nd place, silver medalist(s)	Emilea Zingas; Vadym Kolesnik	United States	193.51	2	76.24	2	117.27
3rd place, bronze medalist(s)	Leah Neset; Artem Markelov	United States	176.27	3	68.77	3	107.50
4	Hannah Lim; Ye Quan	South Korea	172.16	4	66.99	4	105.17
5	Alicia Fabbri; Paul Ayer	Canada	169.38	5	66.69	5	102.69
6	Utana Yoshida; Masaya Morita	Japan	161.06	6	62.81	6	98.25
7	Lily Hensen; Nathan Lickers	Canada	154.03	7	60.29	7	93.74
8	Daniela Ivanitskiy; Matthew Sperry	Finland	131.15	8	51.40	8	79.75

== Works cited ==
- "Special Regulations & Technical Rules – Single & Pair Skating and Ice Dance 2024" (PDF). International Skating Union. Archived (PDF) from the original on June 3, 2025.
