= 2025–26 ISU Challenger Series =

Figure skating competition

- Type: ISU Challenger Series
- Date: August 7 – December 6, 2025
- Season: 2025–26
- Previous: 2024–25 ISU Challenger Series
- Next: 2026–27 ISU Challenger Series

The 2025–26 ISU Challenger Series is a series of senior international competitions organized by the International Skating Union that were held from August to December 2025. It was the eleventh season of the ISU Challenger Series, a group of senior-level international figure skating competitions. Skaters were eligible to compete in the Challenger Series if they have reached the age of 17 before July 1, 2025.

== Competitions ==
The International Skating Union announced the Challenger Series schedule on May 8, 2025. This season, the series comprised the following events.

Date	Event	Location	Notes	Ref.
August 7–10	(United States) 2025 Cranberry Cup International	Norwood, Massachusetts, United States	Men's and women's singles only	
September 2–3	(United States) 2025 John Nicks International Pairs Competition	New York City, New York, United States	Pairs only	
September 5–7	(Japan) 2025 Kinoshita Group Cup	Osaka, Japan	—N/a	
September 11–14	(Italy) 2025 Lombardia Trophy	Bergamo, Italy	No pairs	
September 25–27	(Germany) 2025 Nebelhorn Trophy	Oberstdorf, Germany	—N/a	
September 25–27	(Slovakia) 2025 Nepela Memorial	Bratislava, Slovakia	No pairs	
October 1–4	(Kazakhstan) 2025 Denis Ten Memorial Challenge	Astana, Kazakhstan	No pairs	
October 8–11	(Georgia (country)) 2025 Trialeti Trophy	Tbilisi, Georgia	—N/a	
November 19–23	(Poland) 2025 Warsaw Cup	Warsaw, Poland	No pairs	
November 24–30	(Estonia) 2025 Tallinn Trophy	Tallinn, Estonia	No pairs	
December 3–6	(Croatia) 2025 Golden Spin of Zagreb	Zagreb, Croatia	—N/a	

== Medal summary ==
=== Men's singles ===
Challenger Series
Competition	Gold	Silver	Bronze	Ref.
(United States) Cranberry Cup International	(Canada) Roman Sadovsky	(Estonia) Aleksandr Selevko	(Canada) Stephen Gogolev	
(Japan) Kinoshita Group Cup	(South Korea) Cha Jun-hwan	(Japan) Kazuki Tomono	(United States) Tomoki Hiwatashi	
(Italy) Lombardia Trophy	(United States) Ilia Malinin	(Japan) Yuma Kagiyama	(Italy) Nikolaj Memola	
(Germany) Nebelhorn Trophy	(Canada) Stephen Gogolev	(United States) Andrew Torgashev	(Switzerland) Lukas Britschgi	
(Slovakia) Nepela Memorial	(France) Kévin Aymoz	(Italy) Matteo Rizzo	(Italy) Daniel Grassl	
(Kazakhstan) Denis Ten Memorial Challenge	(Kazakhstan) Mikhail Shaidorov	(Georgia (country)) Nika Egadze	(United States) Jason Brown	
(Georgia (country)) Trialeti Trophy	(Georgia (country)) Nika Egadze	(United States) Jason Brown	(United States) Tomoki Hiwatashi	
(Poland) Warsaw Cup	(Poland) Vladimir Samoilov	(Switzerland) Lukas Britschgi	(France) Samy Hammi	
(Estonia) Tallinn Trophy	(Estonia) Aleksandr Selevko	(Italy) Matteo Rizzo	(Estonia) Arlet Levandi	
(Croatia) Golden Spin of Zagreb	(France) Kévin Aymoz	(Estonia) Arlet Levandi	(France) Luc Economides	

=== Women's singles ===
Challenger Series
Competition	Gold	Silver	Bronze	Ref.
(United States) Cranberry Cup International	(United States) Isabeau Levito	(Kazakhstan) Sofia Samodelkina	(South Korea) Shin Ji-a	
(Japan) Kinoshita Group Cup	(Japan) Mone Chiba	(Japan) Kaori Sakamoto	(Japan) Saki Miyake	
(Italy) Lombardia Trophy	(Japan) Rion Sumiyoshi	(Japan) Ami Nakai	(United States) Sarah Everhardt	
(Germany) Nebelhorn Trophy	(United States) Amber Glenn	(Japan) Mone Chiba	(South Korea) Shin Ji-a	
(Slovakia) Nepela Memorial	(Italy) Lara Naki Gutmann	(Italy) Anna Pezzetta	(Italy) Sarina Joos	
(Kazakhstan) Denis Ten Memorial Challenge	(South Korea) Lee Hae-in	(South Korea) Yun Ah-sun	(Canada) Madeline Schizas	
(Georgia (country)) Trialeti Trophy	(Georgia (country)) Anastasiia Gubanova	(Israel) Mariia Seniuk	(South Korea) Lee Hae-in	
(Poland) Warsaw Cup	(Canada) Sara-Maude Dupuis	(Italy) Marina Piredda	(Norway) Mia Risa Gomez	
(Estonia) Tallinn Trophy	(Finland) Olivia Lisko	(United States) Sarah Everhardt	(United States) Alina Bonillo	
(Croatia) Golden Spin of Zagreb	(United States) Bradie Tennell	(Finland) Iida Karhunen	(Kazakhstan) Sofia Samodelkina	

=== Pairs ===
Challenger Series
Competition	Gold	Silver	Bronze	Ref.
(United States) John Nicks International Pairs Competition	(Canada); Deanna Stellato-Dudek; Maxime Deschamps	(United States); Alisa Efimova; Misha Mitrofanov	(United States); Katie McBeath; Daniil Parkman	
(Japan) Kinoshita Group Cup	(Japan); Riku Miura; Ryuichi Kihara	(Georgia (country)); Anastasiia Metelkina; Luka Berulava	(Japan); Yuna Nagaoka; Sumitada Moriguchi	
(Germany) Nebelhorn Trophy	(Germany); Minerva Fabienne Hase; Nikita Volodin	(Japan); Riku Miura; Ryuichi Kihara	(United States); Alisa Efimova; Misha Mitrofanov	
(Georgia (country)) Trialeti Trophy	(Georgia (country)); Anastasiia Metelkina; Luka Berulava	(Germany); Minerva Fabienne Hase; Nikita Volodin	(United States); Emily Chan; Spencer Akira Howe	
(Croatia) Golden Spin of Zagreb	(United States); Audrey Shin; Balazs Nagy	(United States); Valentina Plazas; Maximiliano Fernandez	(Switzerland); Oxana Vouillamoz; Tom Bouvart	

=== Ice dance ===
Challenger Series
Competition	Gold	Silver	Bronze	Ref.
(Japan) Kinoshita Group Cup	(Canada); Marie-Jade Lauriault; Romain Le Gac	(United States); Emilea Zingas; Vadym Kolesnik	(United States); Leah Neset; Artem Markelov	
(Italy) Lombardia Trophy	(United States); Eva Pate; Logan Bye	(Czech Republic); Katerina Mrazkova; Daniel Mrazek	(United States); Katarina Wolfkostin; Dimitry Tsarevski	
(Germany) Nebelhorn Trophy	(United Kingdom); Lilah Fear; Lewis Gibson	(United States); Christina Carreira; Anthony Ponomarenko	(Canada); Marie-Jade Lauriault; Romain le Gac	
(Slovakia) Nepela Memorial	(Spain); Olivia Smart; Tim Dieck	(Czech Republic); Natalie Taschlerova; Filip Taschler	(United States); Caroline Green; Michael Parsons	
(Kazakhstan) Denis Ten Memorial Challenge	(Georgia (country)); Diana Davis; Gleb Smolkin	(United States); Oona Brown; Gage Brown	(Sweden); Milla Ruud Reitan; Nikolaj Majorov	
(Georgia (country)) Trialeti Trophy	(Georgia (country)); Diana Davis; Gleb Smolkin	(Australia); Holly Harris; Jason Chan	(France); Loicia Demougeot; Théo le Mercier	
(Poland) Warsaw Cup	(France); Evgeniia Lopareva; Geoffrey Brissaud	(South Korea); Hannah Lim; Ye Quan	(United States); Caroline Green; Michael Parsons	
(Estonia) Tallinn Trophy	(Spain); Olivia Smart; Tim Dieck	(Germany); Jennifer Janse van Rensburg; Benjamin Steffan	(Czech Republic); Natalie Taschlerova; Filip Taschler	
(Croatia) Golden Spin of Zagreb	(Italy); Charlene Guignard; Marco Fabbri	(France); Loicia Demougeot; Théo le Mercier	(Czech Republic); Katerina Mrazkova; Daniel Mrazek	

=== Medal standings ===
Rank	Nation	Gold	Silver	Bronze	Total
1	United States	6	8	12	26
2	Georgia	5	2	0	7
3	Canada	5	0	3	8
4	Japan	3	6	2	11
5	France	3	1	3	7
6	Italy	2	4	3	9
7	South Korea	2	2	3	7
8	Spain	2	0	0	2
9	Estonia	1	2	1	4
10	Germany	1	2	0	3
11	Kazakhstan	1	1	1	3
12	Finland	1	1	0	2
13	Great Britain	1	0	0	1
13	Poland	1	0	0	1
15	Czech Republic	0	2	2	4
16	Switzerland	0	1	2	3
17	Australia	0	1	0	1
17	Israel	0	1	0	1
19	Norway	0	0	1	1
19	Sweden	0	0	1	1
Totals (20 entries)		34	34	34	102

== Challenger Series rankings ==
The ISU Challenger Series rankings were formed by combining the two highest final scores of each skater or team.

=== Men's singles ===
As of December 7, 2025

No.	Skater	Nation	First event	Score	Second event	Score	Total score
1	Nika Egadze	Georgia	2025 CS Denis Ten Memorial Challenge	266.90	2025 CS Trialeti Trophy	261.02	527.92
2	Jason Brown	United States	2025 CS Denis Ten Memorial Challenge	257.81	2025 CS Trialeti Trophy	249.30	507.11
3	Kévin Aymoz	France	2025 CS Nepela Memorial	261.90	2025 CS Golden Spin of Zagreb	239.52	501.42
4	Stephen Gogolev	Canada	2025 CS Cranberry Cup International	231.81	2025 CS Nebelhorn Trophy	255.06	486.87
5	Nikolaj Memola	Italy	2025 CS Lombardia Trophy	265.37	2025 CS Nepela Memorial	220.05	485.42

=== Women's singles ===
As of December 7, 2025

No.	Skater	Nation	First event	Score	Second event	Score	Total score
1	Mone Chiba	Japan	2025 CS Kinoshita Group Cup	216.59	2025 CS Nebelhorn Trophy	213.64	430.23
2	Isabeau Levito	United States	2025 CS Cranberry Cup International	207.61	2025 CS Nebelhorn Trophy	207.21	414.82
3	Lara Naki Gutmann	Italy	2025 CS Lombardia Trophy	195.95	2025 CS Nepela Memorial	202.51	398.46
4	Shin Ji-a	South Korea	2025 CS Cranberry Cup International	179.97	2025 CS Nebelhorn Trophy	208.45	388.42
5	Sofia Samodelkina	Kazakhstan	2025 CS Cranberry Cup International	203.15	2025 CS Golden Spin of Zagreb	182.63	385.78

=== Pairs ===
As of December 7, 2025

No.	Team	Nation	First event	Score	Second event	Score	Total score
1	Riku Miura; Ryuichi Kihara	Japan	2025 CS Kinoshita Group Cup	222.94	2025 CS Nebelhorn Trophy	221.03	443.97
2	Anastasiia Metelkina; Luka Berulava	Georgia	2025 CS Kinoshita Group Cup	212.90	2025 CS Trialeti Trophy	225.20	438.10
3	Minerva Fabienne Hase; Nikita Volodin	Germany	2025 CS Nebelhorn Trophy	221.38	2025 CS Trialeti Trophy	208.28	429.66
4	Alisa Efimova; Misha Mitrofanov	United States	2025 CS John Nicks International Pairs Competition	193.54	2025 CS Nebelhorn Trophy	193.79	387.33
5	Emily Chan; Spencer Akira Howe	United States	2025 CS John Nicks International Pairs Competition	183.22	2025 CS Trialeti Trophy	193.70	376.92

=== Ice dance ===
As of December 7, 2025

No.	Team	Nation	First event	Score	Second event	Score	Total score
1	Diana Davis; Gleb Smolkin	Georgia	2025 CS Denis Ten Memorial Challenge	193.14	2025 CS Trialeti Trophy	203.39	396.53
2	Evgenia Lopareva; Geoffrey Brissaud	France	2025 CS Nepela Memorial	183.40	2025 CS Warsaw Cup	202.06	385.46
3	Olivia Smart; Tim Dieck	Spain	2025 CS Nepela Memorial	192.67	2025 CS Tallinn Trophy	192.67	385.34
4	Marie-Jade Lauriault; Romain le Gac	Canada	2025 CS Kinoshita Group Cup	197.90	2025 CS Nebelhorn Trophy	180.17	378.07
5	Natalie Taschlerova; Filip Taschler	Czech Republic	2025 CS Nepela Memorial	186.60	2025 CS Tallinn Trophy	191.00	377.60
