= Sit spin =

Figure skating spin position

Figure skating element
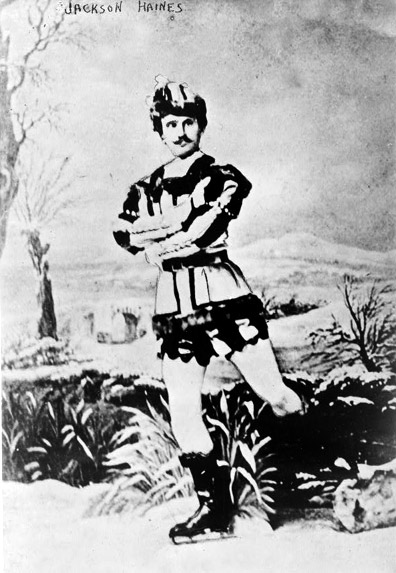
- Jackson Haines, inventor of the sit spin
- Element name: Sit spin
- Alternative name: Jackson Haines spin
- Scoring abbreviation: SSp
- Element type: Spin
- Named for: Jackson Haines

The sit spin (also known as the Jackson Haines spin) is one of the oldest elements in figure skating. It was invented by American figure skater Jackson Haines. It has been called "one of the most important spins in skating". According to figure skater John Misha Petkevich, despite its difficulty to learn and the amount of energy it requires to execute it, "yields immense rewards" for the skater. There is a wide variety of sitting positions skaters have invented. The choice of a sitting position is not determined by aesthetic design or technical objections, but is often determined by convenience. The skater can make refinements to the sit spin, which achieves the following: increases the speed of the spin's rotation; makes the spin more exciting as it ends; and introduces positions that will increase the skater's strength and style.

The spin is executed in a sitting position with the knee of the skating leg bent and the free leg held in front. It is difficult to learn and requires a great deal of energy, but it has variations that make it more creative and pleasurable to watch. When executing the sit spin, a skater's back should be straight and not curved, their hips should be lower than the skating knee, and their free leg should be straight. The best sit spin position minimizes the moment of inertia and keeps the heaviest parts of the body as close to the vertical center of gravity as possible. This position is difficult to maintain, however, so skaters will often collapse into a low sit spin position.

== Gallery ==
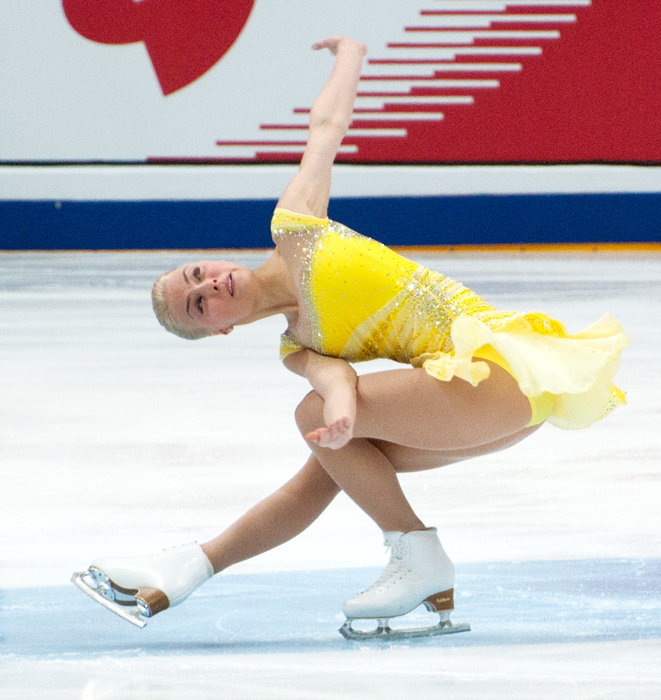
(Kiira Korpi)

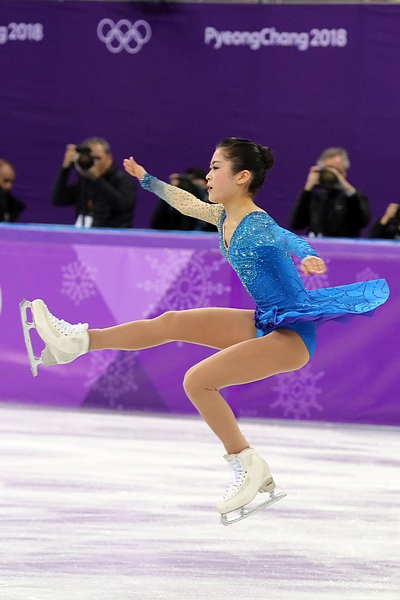
Flying sit spin
(Satoko Miyahara)

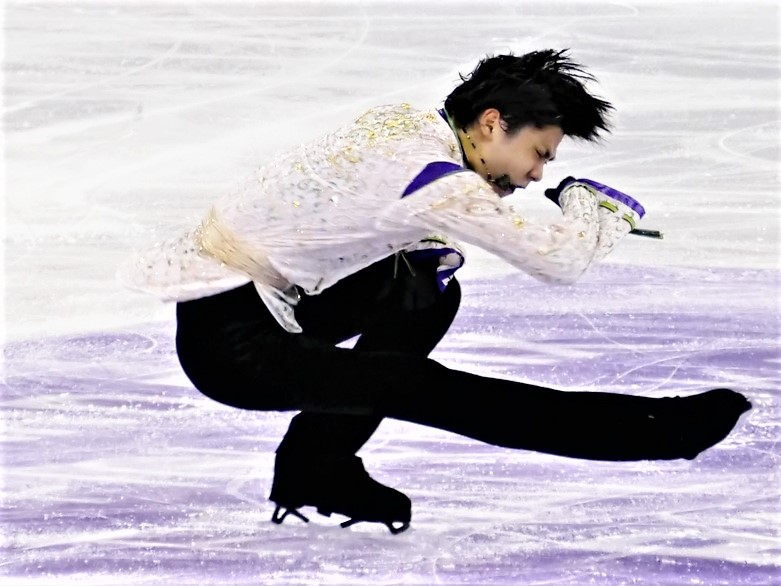
Deep sit spin with stretched free leg
(Yuzuru Hanyu)

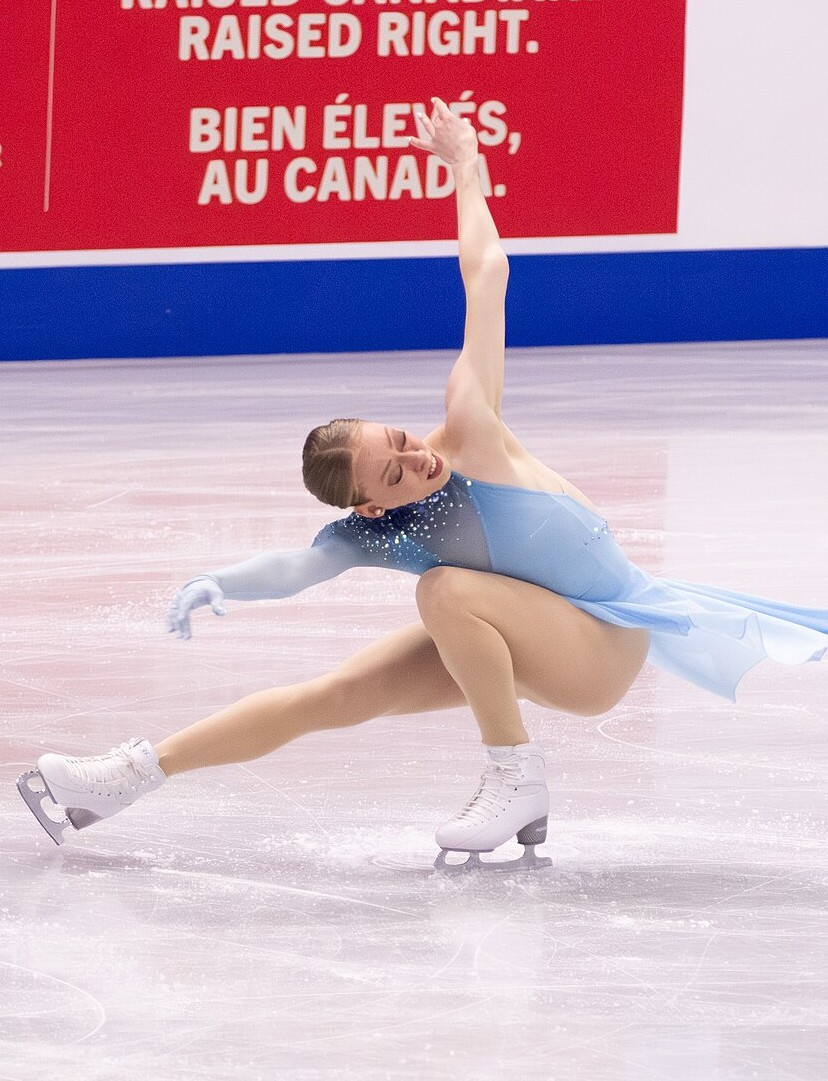
Broken leg sit spin variation
(Bradie Tennell)

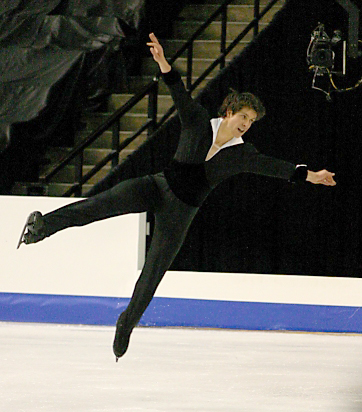
Death drop into a back sit spin
(Ryan Jahnke)

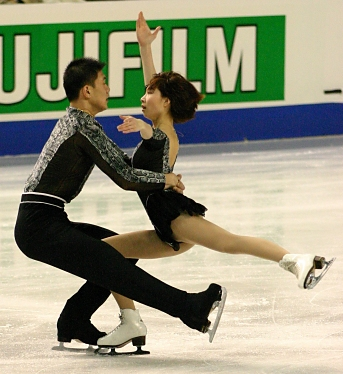
Pair sit spin
(Dan Zhang & Hao Zhang)

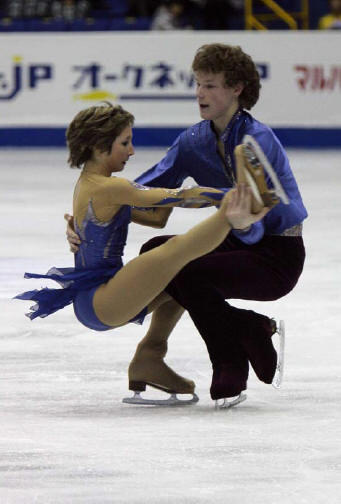
Pair sit spin
(Sabina Imaikina & Andrei Novoselov)

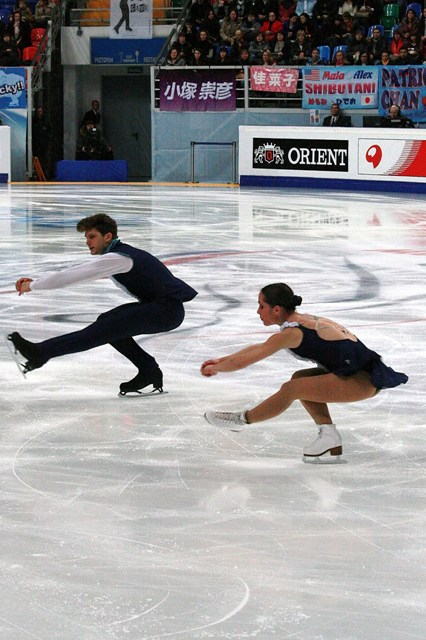
Side-by-side sit spins
(Nicole Della Monica & Matteo Guarise)

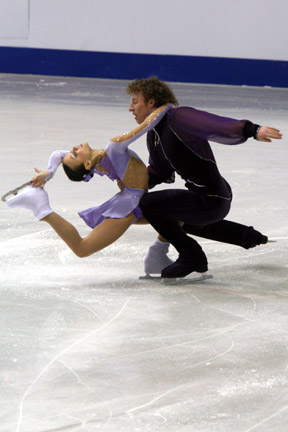
Pair sit and catch-foot layback
(Lubov Iliushechkina & Nodari Maisuradze)

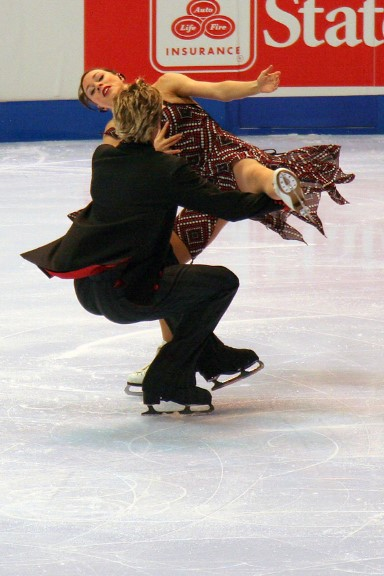
Dance spin (sit and camel)
(Nathalie Pechalat & Fabian Bourzat)

== Works cited ==
- Petkevich, John Misha (1988). Sports Illustrated Figure Skating: Championship Techniques (1st ed.). New York: Sports Illustrated. ISBN 978-1-4616-6440-6. OCLC 815289537.
