= Tibau (surname) =

Tibau is a surname. Notable people with the surname include:

- Catharina Guedes Tibau (born 2006), Brazilian ice dancer
- Gleison Tibau (born 1983), Brazilian mixed martial artist
