= 2022–23 figure skating season =

Competitive figure skating year, 2022/7/1 to 2023/6/30

- Date: July 1, 2022 – June 30, 2023
- Previous: 2021–22
- Next: 2023–24

The 2022–23 figure skating season began on July 1, 2022, and ended on June 30, 2023. During this season, elite skaters competed at the ISU (International Skating Union) Championship level at the 2023 European Championships, Four Continents Championships, World Junior Championships, and World Championships. They also competed at elite events such as the ISU Challenger Series as well as the Grand Prix and Junior Grand Prix series, culminating at the Grand Prix Final.

On March 1, 2022, the International Skating Union banned all figure skaters and officials from Russia and Belarus from attending any international competitions following the 2022 Russian invasion of Ukraine.

The season was the first under newly elected ISU President Kim Jae-youl and ISU Vice President for Figure Skating Benoît Lavoie.

== Season notes ==
=== Age eligibility ===
Skaters were eligible to compete in ISU events on the junior or senior levels according to their age. These rules may not have applied to non-ISU events such as national championships.

Level	Date of birth
Junior (females in all disciplines; males in singles)	Born between July 1, 2003 & June 30, 2009
Junior (males in pairs & ice dance)	Born between July 1, 2001 & June 30, 2009
Senior (all disciplines)	Born before July 1, 2007

Background

At the ISU Congress held in Phuket, Thailand, in June 2022, members of the ISU Council accepted a proposal to gradually increase the minimum age limit for senior competition to 17 years old beginning with the 2024–25 season. In order to avoid forcing skaters who had already competed in the senior category to return to juniors, the age limit remained unchanged during the 2022–23 season, before increasing to 16 years old during the 2023–24 season, and then 17 years old during the 2024–25 season. Although there had been previous proposals to increase the age limit, the 2022 vote gained traction following the doping scandal of then 15-year-old Kamila Valieva of Russia at the 2022 Winter Olympics.

=== Death of Dmytro Sharpar ===
On 23 January 2023, Ukrainian media reported that 25-year-old former pair skater Dmytro Sharpar (Ukrainian: Дмитро Шарпар) had been killed near Bakhmut, where the Ukrainian army was defending against invading Russian forces (see Battle of Bakhmut). Born in Kharkiv, Sharpar skated for Ukraine in partnership with Anastasia Pobizhenko at the 2016 Winter Youth Olympics.

== Changes ==
The date provided is the date when the change occurred or, if not available, the date when the change was announced.

=== Partnership changes ===
Date	Skaters	Disc.	Type	Notes	Ref.
July 7, 2022	(Brazil); Catharina Tibau; Cayden Dawson	Ice dance	Formed	For Brazil	
July 10, 2022	(Finland); Arina Klinovitskaya; Jussiville Partanen	Ice dance	Split		
July 13, 2022	(Russia); Alexandra Kravchenko; Alexander Shustitskiy	Ice dance	Formed		
July 20, 2022	(Romania); Malene Nichita; Jussiville Partanen	Ice dance	Formed	For Romania	
July 29, 2022	(Germany); Charise Matthaei; Max Liebers	Ice dance	Formed		
August 5, 2022	(Canada); Evelyn Walsh; Trennt Michaud	Pairs	Split	Walsh retired.	
August 20, 2022	(United States); Avonley Nguyen; Grigory Smirnov	Ice dance	Split	Smirnov retired.	
August 27, 2022	(Japan); Rikako Fukase; Eichu Cho	Ice dance	Split	Fukase switched to synchronised skating for Canada; Cho retired.	
September 2, 2022	(Canada); Lia Pereira; Trennt Michaud	Pairs	Formed		
September 2, 2022	(Hungary); Anna Yanovskaya; Ádám Lukács	Ice dance	Split		
September 7, 2022	(Australia); Campbell Young; Lachlan Lewer	Pairs	Split		
September 7, 2022	(United States); Naomi Williams; Lachlan Lewer	Pairs	Formed	For the United States	
September 8, 2022	(Austria); Sophia Schaller; Livio Mayr	Pairs	Formed		
September 17, 2022	(Italy); Lucrezia Beccari; Matteo Guarise	Pairs	Formed		
September 22, 2022	(Austria); Giorgia Ghedini; Luc Maierhofer	Pairs	Formed	For Austria	
September 28, 2022	(South Korea); Cho Hye-jin; Steven Adcock	Pairs	Formed	For South Korea	
October 17, 2022	(Turkey); Katerina DelCamp; Berk Akalın	Ice dance	Formed	For Turkey	
October 21, 2022	(Russia); Daria Boyarintseva; Roman Pleshkov	Pairs			
October 30, 2022	(United States); Chelsea Liu; Daniel O'Shea	Pairs	Split		
October 30, 2022	(United States); Ellie Kam; Daniel O'Shea	Pairs	Formed		
November 17, 2022	(Hungary); Maria Pavlova; Balázs Nagy	Pairs	Split		
November 17, 2022	(Hungary); Maria Pavlova; Alexei Sviatchenko	Pairs	Formed		
November 21, 2022	(Japan); Miyu Yunoki; Shoya Ichihashi	Pairs	Split		
November 28, 2022	(Spain); Sofía Val; Asaf Kazimov	Ice dance	Formed	For Spain	
December 1, 2022	(Russia); Annabelle Morozov; Devid Naryzhnyy	Ice dance	Split		
December 22, 2022	(Czech Republic); Jelizaveta Žuková; Martin Bidař	Pairs	Split		
December 28, 2022	(Spain); Olivia Smart; Tim Dieck	Ice dance	Formed	For Spain	
December 31, 2022	(Australia); Maria Chernyshova; Harley Windsor	Pairs	Split		
January 14, 2023	(Russia); Irina Khavronina; Dario Cirisano	Ice dance	Split		
January 16, 2023	(Russia); Alena Kostornaia; Georgy Kunitsa	Pairs	Formed		
January 16, 2023	(Russia); Irina Khavronina; Devid Naryzhnyy	Ice dance	Formed		
January 17, 2023	(Georgia (country)); Anastasiia Metelkina; Daniil Parkman	Pairs	Split		
January 24, 2023	(Italy); Carolina Portesi Peroni; Michael Chrastecky	Ice dance	Split		
January 30, 2023	(Czech Republic); Denisa Cimlová; Joti Polizoakis	Ice dance	Split		
February 3, 2023	(France); Coline Keriven; Tom Bouvart	Pairs	Split	Keriven retired.	
February 8, 2023	(United States); Katarina Wolfkostin; Jeffrey Chen	Ice dance	Split		
February 25, 2023	(Canada); Haley Sales; Nikolas Wamsteeker	Ice dance	Split	Wamsteeker retired.	
March 29, 2023	(Germany); Alisa Efimova; Ruben Blommaert	Pairs	Split	Blommaert retired.	
April 4, 2023	(Russia); Daria Pavliuchenko; Denis Khodykin	Pairs	Split		
April 7, 2023	(Georgia (country)); Karina Safina; Luka Berulava	Pairs	Split		
April 12, 2023	(Israel); Shira Ichilov; Dmitry Kravchenko	Ice dance	Formed	For Israel	
April 17, 2023	(Italy); Noemi Maria Tali; Noah Lafornara	Ice dance	Formed	For Italy	
April 22, 2023	(Japan); Haruna Murakami; Sumitada Moriguchi	Pairs	Split	They plan to re-partner when they are both age-eligible for senior competitions.	
April 25, 2023	(Russia); Sofia Shevchenko; Andrei Yezhlov	Ice dance	Formed	Shevchenko came out of retirement.	
April 27, 2023	(New Zealand); Charlotte Lafond-Fournier; Richard Kang-in Kam	Ice dance	Split		
May 6, 2023	(Japan); Azusa Tanaka; Shingo Nishiyama	Ice dance	Formed		
May 6, 2023	(South Korea); Cho Hye-jin; Steven Adcock	Pairs	Split	Adcock retired.	
May 6, 2023	(Czech Republic); Barbora Kuciánová; Martin Bidař	Pairs	Formed		
May 8, 2023	(United States); Chelsea Liu; Balázs Nagy	Pairs	Formed	For the United States	
May 12, 2023	(Sweden); Milla Ruud Reitan; Nikolaj Majorov	Ice dance	Formed	For Sweden	
May 15, 2023	(Japan); Yuna Nagaoka; Sumitada Moriguchi	Pairs	Formed		
May 16, 2023	(United States); Katarina Wolfkostin; Dmitry Tsarevski	Ice dance	Formed		
May 18, 2023	(Japan); Sae Shimizu; Lucas Tsuyoshi Honda	Pairs	Formed		
May 22, 2023	(Germany); Lara Luft; Maximilian Pfisterer	Ice dance	Split		
May 31, 2023	(Germany); Minerva Fabienne Hase; Nikita Volodin	Pairs	Formed	For Germany	
June 2, 2023	(Japan); Utana Yoshida; Masaya Morita	Ice dance	Formed		
June 5, 2023	(Georgia (country)); Anastasia Metelkina; Luka Berulava	Pairs	Formed		
June 6, 2023	(China); Peng Cheng; Jin Yang	Pairs	Split		
June 6, 2023	(China); Peng Cheng; Wang Lei	Pairs	Formed		
June 13, 2023	(Finland); Tilda Alteryd; Valtter Virtanen	Pairs	Formed	For Finland	
June 18, 2023	(United States); Hazel Collier; Misha Mitrofanov	Pairs	Split		
June 18, 2023	(United States); Alisa Efimova; Misha Mitrofanov	Pairs	Formed	For the United States	
June 22, 2023	(Russia); Sofya Tyutyunina; Andrei Bagin	Ice dance	Split		

=== Retirements ===
Date	Skater(s)	Disc.	Ref.
July 7, 2022	(Canada) Véronik Mallet	Women	
July 11, 2022	(Canada) Vanessa James / Eric Radford	Pairs	
July 16, 2022	(Poland) Natalia Kaliszek / Maksym Spodyriev	Ice dance	
July 17, 2022	(Italy) Carolina Moscheni / Francesco Fioretti	Ice dance	
July 18, 2022	(Republic of Ireland) Conor Stakelum	Men	
July 19, 2022	(Japan) Yuzuru Hanyu	Men	
August 5, 2022	(Canada) Evelyn Walsh	Pairs	
August 10, 2022	(Philippines) Alisson Krystle Perticheto	Women	
August 13, 2022	(Ukraine) Oleksandra Nazarova / Maksym Nikitin	Ice dance	
August 20, 2022	(United States) Grigory Smirnov	Ice dance	
August 27, 2022	(Japan) Eichu Cho	Ice dance	
August 30, 2022	(Russia) Diana Mukhametzianova	Pairs	
September 6, 2022	(Azerbaijan) Ekaterina Ryabova	Women	
October 12, 2022	(United States) Mariah Bell	Women	
October 14, 2022	(Belarus) Konstantin Milyukov	Men	
October 16, 2022	(Czech Republic) Matyáš Bělohradský	Men	
November 26, 2022	(Finland) Jenni Saarinen	Women	
November 30, 2022	(Australia) Kailani Craine	Women	
November 30, 2022	(Australia) James Min	Men	
December 3, 2022	(Iceland) Aldís Kara Bergsdóttir	Women	
December 22, 2022	(Czech Republic) Jelizaveta Žuková	Pairs	
December 24, 2022	(Japan) Yuhana Yokoi	Women	
December 25, 2022	(Japan) Mitsuki Sumoto	Men	
January 3, 2023	(Germany) Paul Fentz	Men	
January 4, 2023	(Russia) Polina Kostiukovich	Pairs	
January 5, 2023	(Russia) Apollinariia Panfilova / Dmitry Rylov	Pairs	
January 20, 2023	(Russia) Stanislava Konstantinova	Women	
January 23, 2023	(Germany) Nolan Seegert	Pairs	
February 3, 2023	(France) Coline Keriven	Pairs	
February 25, 2023	(Canada) Nikolas Wamsteeker	Ice dance	
March 22, 2023	(Slovenia) Daša Grm	Women	
March 29, 2023	(Germany) Ruben Blommaert	Pairs	
May 1, 2023	(Japan) Kana Muramoto / Daisuke Takahashi	Ice dance	
May 6, 2023	(South Korea) Steven Adcock	Pairs	
May 12, 2023	(United Kingdom) Natasha McKay	Women	
May 26. 2023	(Canada) Keegan Messing	Men	
June 5, 2023	(Georgia (country)) Morisi Kvitelashvili	Men	

=== Coaching changes ===
Date	Skater(s)	Disc.	From	To	Ref.
July 24, 2022	(France) Adam Siao Him Fa	Men	Laurent Depouilly & Nathalie Depouilly	Cedric Tour & Rodolphe Marechal	
August 17, 2022	(Italy) Daniel Grassl	Men	Lorenzo Magri	Alexei Letov & Olga Ganicheva	
August 19, 2022	(United States) Caroline Green / Michael Parsons	Ice dance	Alexei Kiliakov & Elena Novak	Charlie White, Tanith White & Greg Zuerlein	
August 20, 2022	(Netherlands) Nicola Todeschini	Men	Gabriele Minchio, Giulia Garello & Stephanie Cuel	Aljona Savchenko	
August 20, 2022	(South Korea) You Young	Women	Mie Hamada, Tammy Gambill & Chi Hyun-jung	Mie Hamada, Viktor Pfeifer & Chi Hyun-jung	
August 22, 2022	(Canada) Conrad Orzel	Men	Brian Orser & Tracey Wilson	Ravi Walia	
August 22, 2022	(United States) Bradie Tennell	Women	Tom Zakrajsek	Benoît Richaud & Cedric Tour	
August 25, 2022	(Russia) Artur Danielian	Men	Elena Buyanova	Evgeni Rukavicin	
August 25, 2022	(Estonia) Solène Mazingue / Marko Jevgeni Gaidajenko	Ice dance	Alexei Sitnikov & Julia Zlobina	Romain Haguenauer, Marie-France Dubreuil & Patrice Lauzon	
August 28, 2022	(United Kingdom) Lydia Smart / Harry Mattick	Pairs	Emma Davies & Richard Beamish	Zoe Jones & Christopher Boyadji	
August 29, 2022	(Switzerland) Alexia Paganini	Women	Gheorghe Chiper	Zoltán Kelemen	
August 31, 2022	(Estonia) Eva-Lotta Kiibus	Women	Anna Levandi	Thomas Kennes	
September 6, 2022	(France) Evgeniia Lopareva / Geoffrey Brissaud	Ice dance	Roxane Petetin, Fabian Bourzat & Alexander Zhulin	Roxane Petetin, Romain Haguenauer, Marie-France Dubreuil & Patrice Lauzon	
September 22, 2022	(Switzerland) Alexia Paganini	Women	Zoltán Kelemen	Michael Huth	
October 1, 2022	(Russia) Alexandra Trusova	Women	Eteri Tutberidze, Daniil Gleikhengauz & Sergei Dudakov	Svetlana Sokolovskaya	
November 4, 2022	(Ukraine) Ivan Shmuratko	Men	Michael Huth, Robert Dierking, Anna Bernauer & Marina Amirkhanova	Laurent Depouilly, Nathalie Depouilly & Ivan Shmuratko	
December 5, 2022	(Italy) Daniel Grassl	Men	Alexei Letov & Olga Ganicheva	Lorenzo Magri, Alisa Mikonsaari, Eva Martinek & Angelina Turenko	
January 13, 2023	(Italy) Daniel Grassl	Men	Lorenzo Magri, Alisa Mikonsaari, Eva Martinek & Angelina Turenko	Eteri Tutberidze, Sergei Dudakov & Daniil Gleikhengauz	
January 16, 2023	(Russia) Alena Kostornaia	Pairs	Elena Buianova	Sergei Roslyakov	
January 16, 2023	(Russia) Devid Naryzhnyy	Ice dance	Irina Zhuk & Alexander Svinin	Denis Samokhin	
January 16, 2023	(Russia) Irina Khavronina	Ice dance	Alexei Gorshkov, Lyudmila Gorshkova, Nikolai Morozov & Ivan Volobuev	Denis Samokhin	
February 19, 2023	(Cyprus) Angelina Kudryavtseva / Ilia Karankevich	Ice dance	Alexei Sitnikov, Julia Zlobina & Alexander Zhulin	Matteo Zanni, Barbora Řezníčková & Denis Lodola	
February 26, 2023	(Hungary) Júlia Láng	Women	Júlia Sebestyén & Szabolcs Vidrai	Angelina Turenko, Alisa Mikonsaari, Lorenzo Magri & Eva Martinek	
March 22, 2023	(Russia) Alexandra Stepanova / Ivan Bukin	Ice dance	Irina Zhuk, Alexander Svinin & Nikolai Morozov	Alexander Zhulin & Petr Durnev	
April 10, 2023	(Russia) Elizaveta Khudaiberdieva / Egor Bazin	Ice dance	Denis Samokhin, Maria Borovikova & Oleg Sudakov	Alexander Zhulin & Petr Durnev	
April 22, 2023	(South Korea) You Young	Women	Mie Hamada, Viktor Pfeifer & Chi Hyun-jung	Chi Hyun-jung	
May 1, 2023	(Japan) Mone Chiba	Women	Soshi Tanaka	Mie Hamada	
May 6, 2023	(Russia) Aleksandra Boikova / Dmitrii Kozlovskii	Pairs	Artur Minchuk & Tamara Moskvina	Eteri Tutberidze, Sergei Dudakov & Daniil Gleikhengauz	
May 12, 2023	(Russia) Anna Frolova	Women	Sergei Davydov	Evgeni Rukavicin	
June 2, 2023	(Lithuania) Paulina Ramanauskaitė / Deividas Kizala	Ice dance	Maurizio Margaglio & Neil Brown	Sara Hurtado & Kirill Khaliavin	
June 18, 2023	(United States) Alisa Efimova	Pairs	Florian Just	Aleksei Letov & Olga Ganicheva	
June 28, 2023	(Korea) Cha Jun-hwan	Men	Brian Orser & Chi Hyun-jung	Chi Hyun-jung	

=== Nationality changes ===
If skaters of different nationalities formed a team, the ISU required that they choose one country to represent.

Date	Skater(s)	Disc.	From	To	Notes	Ref.
July 7, 2022	Catharina Tibau / Cayden Dawson	Ice dance	Canada	Brazil		
July 13, 2022	Natalia Pallu-Neves / Jayin Panesar	Ice dance	Great Britain	Brazil		
July 20, 2022	Jussiville Partanen	Ice dance	Finland	Romania	Partnering with Malene Nichita	
August 9, 2022	Inga Gurgenidze	Women	Russia	Georgia		
August 20, 2022	Nicola Todeschini	Men	Switzerland	Netherlands		
August 27, 2022	Rikako Fukase	Ice dance	Japan	Canada	Switching to synchronized skating	
September 7, 2022	Lachlan Lewer	Pairs	Australia	United States	Partnering with Naomi Williams	
September 28, 2022	Steven Adcock	Pairs	Canada	South Korea	Partnering with Cho Hye-jin	
April 17, 2023	Noah Lafornara	Ice dance	United States	Italy		
May 7, 2023	Carolane Soucisse / Shane Firus	Ice dance	Canada	Ireland		
May 8, 2023	Balázs Nagy	Pairs	Hungary	United States	Partnering with Chelsea Liu	
May 31, 2023	Nikita Volodin	Pairs	Russia	Germany	Partnering with Minerva Fabienne Hase	
June 5, 2023	Diana Davis / Gleb Smolkin	Ice dance	Russia	Georgia		
June 15, 2023	Tim Dieck	Ice dance	Germany	Spain	Partnering with Olivia Smart	
June 18, 2023	Alisa Efimova	Pairs	Germany	United States	Partnering with Misha Mitrofanov	

== International competitions ==
Scheduled competitions:

Code key

- S – Senior event
- J – Junior event
- N – Novice event
- M – Men's singles
- W – Women's singles
- P – Pair skating
- D – Ice dance

Color key

- ISU Championships
- Grand Prix or Junior Grand Prix
- Challenger Series
- Other competition

2022
Dates	Event	Type	Level	Disc.	Location	Results
July 27–29	Lake Placid Ice Dance International	Other	S/J	D	Lake Placid, New York, United States	Details
August 3–7	Philadelphia Summer International	Other	S/J	M/W	Aston, Pennsylvania, United States	Details
August 10–14	Cranberry Cup International	Other	S/J	M/W	Norwood, Massachusetts, United States	Details
August 24–27	JGP France	Grand Prix	Junior	M/W/D	Courchevel, France	Details
August 27–28	Britannia Cup	Other	All	All	Sheffield, England, United Kingdom	Details
August 31 – September 3	JGP Czech Republic	Grand Prix	Junior	All	Ostrava, Czech Republic	Details
September 2–4	SEA Open Trophy	Other	All	M/W	Singapore	Details
September 7–10	JGP Latvia	Grand Prix	Junior	All	Riga, Latvia	Details
September 8–11	John Nicks Pairs Challenge	Other	S/J	P	New York, New York, United States	Details
September 12–16	U.S. International Classic	Challenger	Senior	All	Lake Placid, New York, United States	Details
September 15–18	Lombardia Trophy	Challenger	Senior	M/W/D	Bergamo, Italy	Details
September 15–18	Lombardia Trophy	Other	Senior	P	Bergamo, Italy	Details
September 21–24	Nebelhorn Trophy	Challenger	Senior	All	Oberstdorf, Germany	Details
September 28 – October 1	JGP Poland I	Grand Prix	Junior	All	Gdańsk, Poland	Details
September 29 – October 1	Nepela Memorial	Challenger	Senior	M/W/D	Bratislava, Slovakia	Details
October 5–8	JGP Poland II	Grand Prix	Junior	All	Gdańsk, Poland	Details
October 5–9	Finlandia Trophy	Challenger	Senior	All	Espoo, Finland	Details
October 8	Japan Open	Other	Senior	M/W	Saitama, Japan	Details
October 12–15	JGP Italy	Grand Prix	Junior	M/W/D	Egna, Italy	Details
October 13–16	Budapest Trophy	Challenger	Senior	M/W/D	Budapest, Hungary	Details
October 13–16	Budapest Trophy	Other	Junior	M/W/D	Budapest, Hungary	Details
October 15–16	Tayside Trophy	Other	S/J	M/W/P	Dundee, Scotland, United Kingdom	Details
October 18–23	Trophée Métropole Nice Côte d'Azur	Other	S/J	All	Nice, France	Details
October 21–23	Skate America	Grand Prix	Senior	All	Norwood, Massachusetts, United States	Details
October 26–29	Denis Ten Memorial Challenge	Challenger	Senior	M/W/D	Almaty, Kazakhstan	Details
October 26–29	Denis Ten Memorial Challenge	Other	Junior	M/W	Almaty, Kazakhstan	Details
October 26–30	Crystal Skate of Romania	Other	S/J	M/W	Bucharest, Romania	Details
October 27–30	Tirnavia Ice Cup	Other	All	M/W	Trnava, Slovakia	Details
October 27–30	Mezzaluna Cup	Other	All	D	Mentana, Italy	Details
October 28–30	Skate Canada International	Grand Prix	Senior	All	Mississauga, Ontario, Canada	Details
November 1–6	Denkova-Staviski Cup	Other	All	M/W	Sofia, Bulgaria	Details 1, 2
November 2–6	47th Volvo Open Cup	Other	S/J	M/W	Riga, Latvia	Details
November 4–6	Grand Prix de France	Grand Prix	Senior	All	Angers, France	Details
November 9–13	Ice Challenge	Challenger	Senior	M/W/D	Graz, Austria	Details
November 9–13	Ice Challenge	Other	Senior	P	Graz, Austria	Details
November 9–13	Ice Challenge	Other	Junior	All	Graz, Austria	Details
November 10–13	Pavel Roman Memorial	Other	All	D	Olomuc, Czech Republic	Details
November 11–13	MK John Wilson Trophy	Grand Prix	Senior	All	Sheffield, England, United Kingdom	Details
November 15–20	Skate Celje	Other	All	M/W	Celje, Slovenia	Details
November 16–20	Open d'Andorra	Other	All	M/W/D	Canillo, Andorra	Details
November 17–20	Warsaw Cup	Challenger	Senior	All	Warsaw, Poland	Details
November 18–20	NHK Trophy	Grand Prix	Senior	All	Sapporo, Japan	Details
November 24–27	Tallinn Trophy	Other	S/J	M/W	Tallinn, Estonia	Details
November 24–27	NRW Trophy	Other	All	M/W/D	Dortmund, Germany	Details
November 25–27	Grand Prix of Espoo	Grand Prix	Senior	All	Espoo, Finland	Details
November 28 – December 4	Santa Claus Cup	Other	All	M/W/D	Budapest, Hungary	Details
November 29 – December 3	Bosphorus Cup	Other	S/J	M/W/D	Istanbul, Turkey	Details
December 5–9	Asian Open Trophy	Other	All	M/W	Jakarta, Indonesia	Details
December 7–10	Golden Spin of Zagreb	Challenger	Senior	All	Sisak, Croatia	Details
December 8–11	Grand Prix Final	Grand Prix	S/J	All	Turin, Italy	Details
December 16–19	Latvia Trophy	Other	S/J	M/W	Riga, Latvia	Details

2023
Dates	Event	Type	Level	Disc.	Location	Results
January 11–15	EduSport Trophy	Other	All	M/W	Otopeni, Romania	Details
January 13–15	Winter World University Games	Other	Senior	M/W/D	Lake Placid, New York, United States	Details
January 18–22	Skate Helena	Other	Senior	W	Belgrade, Serbia	Details
January 18–22	Skate Helena	Other	J/N	M/W	Belgrade, Serbia	Details
January 20–22	48th Volvo Open Cup	Other	S/J	M/W	Riga, Latvia	Details
January 21–28	European Youth Olympic Festival	Other	Junior	M/W	Friuli-Venezia Giulia, Italy	Details
January 23–29	European Championships	Championships	Senior	All	Espoo, Finland	Details
January 27–29	Merano Ice Trophy	Other	Senior	W	Merano, Italy	Details
January 27–29	Merano Ice Trophy	Other	J/N	M/W	Merano, Italy	Details
January 31 – February 5	Bavarian Open	Other	All	All	Oberstdorf, Germany	Details
February 1–5	Nordics Championships	Other	S/J	M/W	Reykjavík, Iceland	Details 1
February 3–7	Sofia Trophy	Other	All	M/W	Sofia, Bulgaria	Details 1, 2
February 7–12	Four Continents Championships	Championships	Senior	All	Colorado Springs, Colorado, United States	Details
February 9–12	Dragon Trophy & Tivoli Cup	Other	All	M/W	Ljubljana, Slovenia	Details 1, 2
February 9–12	Egna Trophy	Other	All	D	Egna, Italy	Details
February 16–19	Tallink Hotels Cup	Other	S/J	M/W	Tallinn, Estonia	Details
February 22–26	Bellu Memorial	Other	S/J	M/W	Bucharest, Romania	Details
February 23–26	International Challenge Cup	Other	S/J	All	Tilburg, Netherlands	Details
February 27 – March 5	World Junior Championships	Championships	Junior	All	Calgary, Alberta, Canada	Details
March 14–19	Maria Olszewska Memorial	Other	All	M/W/D	Łódź, Poland	Details
March 17–19	Coupe du Printemps	Other	All	M//W	Kockelscheuer, Luxembourg	Details
March 18–19	Abu Dhabi Classic Trophy	Other	All	M/W	Abu Dhabi, United Arab Emirates	Details
March 20–26	Worlds Championships	Championships	Senior	All	Saitama, Japan	Details
April 7–9	Wolmar Spring Cup	Other	Senior	W	Riga, Latvia	Details
April 7–9	Wolmar Spring Cup	Other	Junior	M/W	Riga, Latvia	Details
April 12–16	Triglav Trophy & Narcisa Cup	Other	All	M/W	Jesenice, Slovenia	Details 1, 2
April 13–16	World Team Trophy	Other	Senior	All	Tokyo, Japan	Details
May 1–4	Thailand Open Trophy	Other	All	M/W	Bangkok, Thailand	Details
May 15–17	Oceania International	Other	All	M/W	Auckland, New Zealand	Details
May 18–21	Mexico Cup	Other	S/J	M/W	Mexico City, Mexico	Details
June 9–12	Hollins Trophy International	Other	All	M/W	Erina, Australia	Details

=== Cancelled events ===
Several competitions were cancelled by either the ISU, the host federation, or local governments due to the Armenia–Azerbaijan clashes, the COVID-19 pandemic, the Russian invasion of Ukraine, the Turkey–Syria earthquakes, among other reasons.

2022–2023
Dates	Event	Type	Location	Ref.
September 21–24	JGP Armenia	Grand Prix	Yerevan, Armenia	
October 19–23	Mentor Toruń Cup	Other	Toruń, Poland	
November 11–13	Cup of China	Grand Prix	Beijing, China	
November 25–27	Rostelecom Cup	Grand Prix	Moscow, Russia	
November 25–27	Mont Blanc Trophy	Other	Courmayeur, Italy	
December 7–10	Golden Spin of Zagreb	Other	Zagreb, Croatia	
December 8–11	Magic Christmas Cup	Other	Bucharest, Romania	
February 3–5	Icelab Cup	Other	Bergamo, Italy	
February 4–5	Jégvirág Cup	Other	Miskolc, Hungary	
February 6–12	Ephesos Cup	Other	İzmir, Turkey	
February 11–19	ISF Winter Gymnasiade	Other	Erzurum, Turkey	
February 17–19	Sarajevo Open	Other	Sarajevo, Bosnia and Herzegovina	
February 21–24	Ice Mall Cup	Other	Eilat, Israel	
March 26–30	Spring Talents Cup Ukraine	Other	Brovary, Ukraine	
April 6–9	Black Sea Ice Cup	Other	Kranevo, Bulgaria	
April 13–16	Egna Spring Trophy	Other	Egna, Italy	

== International medalists ==
=== Men's singles ===
Championships
Event	Gold	Silver	Bronze	Results
(Finland) European Championships	(France) Adam Siao Him Fa	(Italy) Matteo Rizzo	(Switzerland) Lukas Britschgi	Details
(United States) Four Continents Championships	(Japan) Kao Miura	(Canada) Keegan Messing	(Japan) Shun Sato	Details
(Canada) World Junior Championships	(Japan) Kao Miura	(Switzerland) Naoki Rossi	(Japan) Nozomu Yoshioka	Details
(Japan) World Championships	(Japan) Shoma Uno	(South Korea) Cha Jun-hwan	(United States) Ilia Malinin	Details

Grand Prix
Event	Gold	Silver	Bronze	Results
(United States) Skate America	(United States) Ilia Malinin	(Japan) Kao Miura	(South Korea) Cha Jun-hwan	Details
Skate Canada International	(Japan) Shoma Uno	(Japan) Kao Miura	(Italy) Matteo Rizzo	Details
Grand Prix de France	(France) Adam Siao Him Fa	(Japan) Sōta Yamamoto	(Japan) Kazuki Tomono	Details
(United Kingdom) MK John Wilson Trophy	(Italy) Daniel Grassl	(Latvia) Deniss Vasiļjevs	(Japan) Shun Sato	Details
(Japan) NHK Trophy	(Japan) Shoma Uno	(Japan) Sōta Yamamoto	(South Korea) Cha Jun-hwan	Details
(Finland) Grand Prix of Espoo	(United States) Ilia Malinin	(Japan) Shun Sato	(France) Kévin Aymoz	Details
(Italy) Grand Prix Final	(Japan) Shoma Uno	(Japan) Sōta Yamamoto	(United States) Ilia Malinin	Details

Junior Grand Prix
Event	Gold	Silver	Bronze	Results
JGP France	(Japan) Shunsuke Nakamura	(South Korea) Cha Young-hyun	(Japan) Ryoga Morimoto	Details
JGP Czech Republic	(Japan) Nozomu Yoshioka	(Italy) Nikolaj Memola	(Sweden) Andreas Nordebäck	Details
JGP Latvia	(Italy) Nikolaj Memola	(Japan) Rio Nakata	(Kazakhstan) Rakhat Bralin	Details
JGP Poland I	(United States) Lucas Broussard	(China) Chen Yudong	(Italy) Raffaele Francesco Zich	Details
JGP Poland II	(Japan) Takeru Amine Kataise	(United States) Robert Yampolsky	(South Korea) Seo Min-kyu	Details
JGP Italy	(United States) Lucas Broussard	(Japan) Shunsuke Nakamura	(Japan) Takeru Amine Kataise	Details
(China) JGP Final	(Italy) Nikolaj Memola	(United States) Lucas Broussard	(Japan) Nozomu Yoshioka	Details

Challenger Series
Event	Gold	Silver	Bronze	Results
(United States) U.S. International Classic	(United States) Ilia Malinin	(France) Kévin Aymoz	(United States) Camden Pulkinen	Details
(Italy) Lombardia Trophy	(France) Adam Siao Him Fa	(Japan) Koshiro Shimada	(Italy) Nikolaj Memola	Details
(Germany) Nebelhorn Trophy	(Canada) Keegan Messing	(South Korea) Lee Si-hyeong	(Canada) Roman Sadovsky	Details
(Slovakia) Nepela Memorial	(Italy) Gabriele Frangipani	(South Korea) Cha Jun-hwan	(Latvia) Deniss Vasiļjevs	Details
(Finland) Finlandia Trophy	(South Korea) Cha Jun-hwan	(Georgia (country)) Morisi Kvitelashvili	(Sweden) Andreas Nordebäck	Details
(Hungary) Budapest Trophy	(Italy) Matteo Rizzo	(Switzerland) Lukas Britschgi	(Italy) Nikolaj Memola	Details
(Kazakhstan) Denis Ten Memorial Challenge	(Georgia (country)) Nika Egadze	(Kazakhstan) Dias Jirenbayev	(Azerbaijan) Vladimir Litvintsev	Details
(Austria) Ice Challenge	(United States) Liam Kapeikis	(Sweden) Andreas Nordebäck	(Germany) Nikita Starostin	Details
(Poland) Warsaw Cup	(France) Kévin Aymoz	(Italy) Daniel Grassl	(Switzerland) Lukas Britschgi	Details
(Croatia) Golden Spin of Zagreb	(United States) Camden Pulkinen	(Italy) Matteo Rizzo	(Estonia) Mihhail Selevko	Details

Other international competitions
Event	Gold	Silver	Bronze	Results
(United States) Philadelphia Summer International	(United States) Liam Kapeikis	(United States) Dinh Tran	(Canada) Gabriel Blumenthal	Details
(United States) Cranberry Cup International	(Israel) Mark Gorodnitsky	(United States) Tomoki Hiwatashi	(United States) Eric Sjoberg	Details
(United Kingdom) Britannia Cup	(United Kingdom) Graham Newberry	(United Kingdom) Brandon Bailey	(Republic of Ireland) Samuel McAllister	Details
(Singapore) SEA Open Trophy	(Singapore) Pagiel Yie Ken Sng	(New Zealand) Douglas Gerber	(Hong Kong) Wong Wai Chung Adonis	Details
(United Kingdom) Tayside Trophy	(Austria) Maurizio Zandron	(United Kingdom) Edward Appleby	(Poland) Kornel Witkowski	Details
(France) Trophée Métropole Nice Côte d'Azur	(France) Adam Siao Him Fa	(France) Luc Economides	(Monaco) Davide Lewton Brain	Details
Crystal Skate of Romania	(Austria) Maurizio Zandron	(Italy) Emanuele Indelicato	(Bulgaria) Filip Kaymakchiev	Details
(Slovakia) Tirnavia Ice Cup	(Slovakia) Adam Hagara	(Bulgaria) Alexander Zlatkov	(Bulgaria) Beat Schümperli	Details
(Bulgaria) Denkova-Staviski Cup	(Turkey) Burak Demirboğa	(Turkey) Başar Oktar	(Kazakhstan) Dias Jirenbayev	Details
(Latvia) 47th Volvo Open Cup	(Poland) Vladimir Samoilov	(Estonia) Arlet Levandi	(Ukraine) Kyrylo Marsak	Details
(Slovenia) Skate Celje	(Slovakia) Adam Hagara	(Czech Republic) Petr Kotlařík	(Slovenia) David Sedej	Details
Open d'Andorra	(Monaco) Davide Lewton Brain	(Israel) Lev Vinokur	(France) Corentin Spinar	Details
(Estonia) Tallinn Trophy	(France) Samy Hammi	(Ukraine) Hlib Smotrov	(Ukraine) Kyrylo Marsak	Details
(Germany) NRW Trophy	(Germany) Nikita Starostin	(Germany) Kai Jagoda	(Sweden) Oliver Praetorius	Details
(Hungary) Santa Claus Cup	(Monaco) Davide Lewton Brain	(Slovakia) Adam Hagara	(Hungary) Aleksandr Vlasenko	Details
(Turkey) Bosphorus Cup	(Azerbaijan) Vladimir Litvintsev	(Turkey) Burak Demirboğa	(Turkey) Alp Eren Özkan	Details
(Indonesia) Asian Open Trophy	(China) Chen Yudong	(Hong Kong) Yuen Lap Kan	(New Zealand) Douglas Gerber	Details
Latvia Trophy	(Latvia) Deniss Vasiļjevs	(Ukraine) Hlib Smotrov	No other competitors	Details
(Romania) EduSport Trophy	(United States) Joonsoo Kim	(Romania) Anelin George Enache	No other competitors	Details
(United States) Winter World University Games	(Japan) Sōta Yamamoto	(Japan) Tatsuya Tsuboi	(Italy) Nikolaj Memola	Details
(Latvia) 48th Volvo Open Cup	(Estonia) Arlet Levandi	(Estonia) Jegor Martsenko	(Germany) Louis Weissert	Details
(Italy) European Youth Olympic Festival	(Israel) Nikita Sheiko	(Georgia (country)) Konstantin Supatashvili	(Switzerland) Naoki Rossi	Details
(Germany) Bavarian Open	(Finland) Valtter Virtanen	(Germany) Kai Jagoda	(Ukraine) Kyrylo Marsak	Details
(Iceland) Nordics Championships	(Sweden) Andreas Nordebäck	(Sweden) Gabriel Folkesson	(Finland) Makar Suntsev	Details
(Bulgaria) Sofia Trophy	(Bulgaria) Alexander Zlatkov	(Italy) Raffaele Francesco Zich	(Bulgaria) Beat Schümperli	Details
(Slovenia) Dragon Trophy	(Austria) Luc Maierhofer	(Monaco) Davide Lewton Brain	(Croatia) Jari Kessler	Details
(Estonia) Tallink Hotels Cup	(Estonia) Arlet Levandi	(Latvia) Deniss Vasiļjevs	(Switzerland) Naoki Rossi	Details
(Romania) Bellu Memorial	(Croatia) Jari Kessler	(Bulgaria) Alexander Zlatkov	(Spain) Pablo García	Details
(Netherlands) International Challenge Cup	(Japan) Shun Sato	(Japan) Sōta Yamamoto	(Italy) Matteo Rizzo	Details
(Poland) Maria Olszewska Memorial	(Poland) Kornel Witkowski	(Poland) Miłosz Witkowski	(France) Joshua Rols	Details
(Luxembourg) Coupe du Printemps	(United States) Jimmy Ma	(Japan) Koshiro Shimada	(Canada) Matthew Newnham	Details
(United Arab Emirates) Abu Dhabi Classic Trophy	(Armenia) Semen Daniliants	No other competitors		Details
(Slovenia) Triglav Trophy	(Japan) Nozomu Yoshioka	(Japan) Sumitada Moriguchi	(Italy) Gabriele Frangipani	Details
Thailand Open Trophy	(Hong Kong) Zhao Heung Lai	(Hong Kong) Yuen Lap Kan	(Hong Kong) Wong Wai Chung Adonis	Details
(New Zealand) Oceania International	(New Zealand) Douglas Gerber	No other competitors		Details
Mexico Cup	(Hong Kong) Naoki Ma	(Mexico) Diego Saldaña Garcia	(Mexico) Marco Lara Torres	Details
(Australia) Hollins Trophy International	(Singapore) Pagiel Yie Ken Sng	(New Zealand) Douglas Gerber	(Australia) Charlton Doherty	Details

=== Women's singles ===
Championships
Event	Gold	Silver	Bronze	Results
(Finland) European Championships	(Georgia (country)) Anastasiia Gubanova	(Belgium) Loena Hendrickx	(Switzerland) Kimmy Repond	Details
(United States) Four Continents Championships	(South Korea) Lee Hae-in	(South Korea) Kim Ye-lim	(Japan) Mone Chiba	Details
(Canada) World Junior Championships	(Japan) Mao Shimada	(South Korea) Shin Ji-a	(Japan) Ami Nakai	Details
(Japan) World Championships	(Japan) Kaori Sakamoto	(South Korea) Lee Hae-in	(Belgium) Loena Hendrickx	Details

Grand Prix
Event	Gold	Silver	Bronze	Results
(United States) Skate America	(Japan) Kaori Sakamoto	(United States) Isabeau Levito	(United States) Amber Glenn	Details
Skate Canada International	(Japan) Rinka Watanabe	(United States) Starr Andrews	(South Korea) You Young	Details
Grand Prix de France	(Belgium) Loena Hendrickx	(South Korea) Kim Ye-lim	(Japan) Rion Sumiyoshi	Details
(United Kingdom) MK John Wilson Trophy	(Japan) Mai Mihara	(United States) Isabeau Levito	(Georgia (country)) Anastasiia Gubanova	Details
(Japan) NHK Trophy	(South Korea) Kim Ye-lim	(Japan) Kaori Sakamoto	(Japan) Rion Sumiyoshi	Details
(Finland) Grand Prix of Espoo	(Japan) Mai Mihara	(Belgium) Loena Hendrickx	(Japan) Mana Kawabe	Details
(Italy) Grand Prix Final	(Japan) Mai Mihara	(United States) Isabeau Levito	(Belgium) Loena Hendrickx	Details

Junior Grand Prix
Event	Gold	Silver	Bronze	Results
JGP France	(Japan) Hana Yoshida	(Japan) Ayumi Shibayama	(South Korea) Kim Yu-jae	Details
JGP Czech Republic	(Japan) Mao Shimada	(South Korea) Kwon Min-sol	(Japan) Ikura Kushida	Details
JGP Latvia	(South Korea) Shin Ji-a	(United States) Soho Lee	(Japan) Ami Nakai	Details
JGP Poland I	(Japan) Mao Shimada	(Japan) Mone Chiba	(South Korea) Kim Chae-yeon	Details
JGP Poland II	(Japan) Ami Nakai	(South Korea) Shin Ji-a	(South Korea) Kwon Min-sol	Details
JGP Italy	(Japan) Hana Yoshida	(South Korea) Kim Chae-yeon	(Georgia (country)) Inga Gurgenidze	Details
(China) JGP Final	(Japan) Mao Shimada	(South Korea) Shin Ji-a	(South Korea) Kim Chae-yeon	Details

Challenger Series
Event	Gold	Silver	Bronze	Results
(United States) U.S. International Classic	(South Korea) Kim Ye-lim	(South Korea) You Young	(Japan) Mana Kawabe	Details
(Italy) Lombardia Trophy	(Japan) Rinka Watanabe	(Japan) Kaori Sakamoto	(Poland) Ekaterina Kurakova	Details
(Germany) Nebelhorn Trophy	(Belgium) Loena Hendrickx	(South Korea) Wi Seo-yeong	(Estonia) Eva-Lotta Kiibus	Details
(Slovakia) Nepela Memorial	(United States) Isabeau Levito	(Italy) Lara Naki Gutmann	(South Korea) Lee Hae-in	Details
(Finland) Finlandia Trophy	(South Korea) Kim Ye-lim	(South Korea) Kim Chae-yeon	(Georgia (country)) Anastasiia Gubanova	Details
(Hungary) Budapest Trophy	(United States) Ava Marie Ziegler	(Switzerland) Kimmy Repond	(Estonia) Niina Petrõkina	Details
(Kazakhstan) Denis Ten Memorial Challenge	(South Korea) Kim Min-chae	(Kazakhstan) Anna Levkovets	(South Korea) Choi Da-bin	Details
(Austria) Ice Challenge	(Italy) Anna Pezzetta	(Canada) Kaiya Ruiter	(Switzerland) Kimmy Repond	Details
(Poland) Warsaw Cup	(Poland) Ekaterina Kurakova	(Switzerland) Sarina Joos	(Finland) Janna Jyrkinen	Details
(Croatia) Golden Spin of Zagreb	(United States) Lindsay Thorngren	(United States) Bradie Tennell	(Canada) Madeline Schizas	Details

Other international competitions
Event	Gold	Silver	Bronze	Results
(United States) Philadelphia Summer International	(United States) Isabeau Levito	(United States) Lindsay Thorngren	(United States) Gracie Gold	Details
(United States) Cranberry Cup International	(United States) Audrey Shin	(United States) Sonja Hilmer	(United States) Amber Glenn	Details
(United Kingdom) Britannia Cup	(United Kingdom) Nina Povey	(United Kingdom) Rebecca Gillespie	(United Kingdom) Emily Hayward	Details
(Singapore) SEA Open Trophy	(South Korea) Park Yeon-jeong	(Australia) Vlada Vasiliev	(South Korea) Jung Ye-an	Details
(United Kingdom) Tayside Trophy	(Austria) Olga Mikutina	(Czech Republic) Eliška Březinová	(United Kingdom) Natasha McKay	Details
(France) Trophée Métropole Nice Côte d'Azur	(France) Léa Serna	(Belgium) Jade Hovine	(France) Maïa Mazzara	Details
Crystal Skate of Romania	(Italy) Lara Naki Gutmann	(Romania) Julia Sauter	(Lithuania) Aleksandra Golovkina	Details
(Slovakia) Tirnavia Ice Cup	(Austria) Stefanie Pesendorfer	(Switzerland) Shaline Rüegger	(Czech Republic) Barbora Vránková	Details
(Bulgaria) Denkova-Staviski Cup	(Bulgaria) Alexandra Feigin	(Norway) Mia Caroline Risa Gomez	(Italy) Elena Agostinelli	Details
(Latvia) 47th Volvo Open Cup	(Finland) Janna Jyrkinen	(Estonia) Kristina Škuleta-Gromova	(Finland) Emmi Peltonen	Details
(Slovenia) Skate Celje	(Czech Republic) Eliška Březinová	(United Kingdom) Nina Povey	(Slovenia) Daša Grm	Details
Open d'Andorra	(Norway) Mia Caroline Risa Gomez	(Spain) Marie Kolly	(Spain) Lucía Ruíz Manzano	Details
(Estonia) Tallinn Trophy	(Sweden) Josefin Taljegård	(Latvia) Angelīna Kučvaļska	(Estonia) Kristina Škuleta-Gromova	Details
(Germany) NRW Trophy	(Belgium) Jade Hovine	(Austria) Stefanie Pesendorfer	(Germany) Kristina Isaev	Details
(Hungary) Santa Claus Cup	(Norway) Mia Caroline Risa Gomez	(Israel) Mariia Seniuk	(Estonia) Kristina Škuleta-Gromova	Details
(Turkey) Bosphorus Cup	(Moldova) Anastasia Gracheva	(Romania) Julia Sauter	(Czech Republic) Eliška Březinová	Details
(Indonesia) Asian Open Trophy	(Philippines) Sofia Lexi Jacqueline Frank	(Hong Kong) Joanna So	(Chinese Taipei) Ting Tzu-Han	Details
Latvia Trophy	(Latvia) Sofja Stepčenko	(Belgium) Nina Pinzarrone	(Cyprus) Marilena Kitromilis	Details
(Romania) EduSport Trophy	(United Kingdom) Kristen Spours	(Romania) Julia Sauter	(United Kingdom) Nina Povey	Details
(United States) Winter World University Games	(Japan) Mai Mihara	(Japan) Kaori Sakamoto	(South Korea) Kim Ye-lim	Details
(Serbia) Skate Helena	(Bulgaria) Kristina Grigorova	(Serbia) Antonina Dubinina	(Croatia) Hana Cvijanović	Details
(Latvia) 48th Volvo Open Cup	(Latvia) Sofja Stepčenko	(Estonia) Nataly Langerbaur	(Finland) Olivia Lisko	Details
(Italy) European Youth Olympic Festival	(Finland) Iida Karhunen	(Italy) Anna Pezzetta	(Poland) Noelle Streuli	Details
(Italy) Merano Cup	(Ukraine) Mariia Andriichuk	(Italy) Alice Orru	No other competitors	Details
(Germany) Bavarian Open	(Italy) Marina Piredda	(Germany) Kristina Isaev	(Cyprus) Marilena Kitromilis	Details
(Iceland) Nordics Championships	(Finland) Nella Pelkonen	(Finland) Janna Jyrkinen	(Finland) Olivia Lisko	Details
(Bulgaria) Sofia Trophy	(Bulgaria) Alexandra Feigin	(Bulgaria) Kristina Grigorova	(Italy) Elena Agostinelli	Details
(Slovenia) Dragon Trophy	(Italy) Lara Naki Gutmann	(Romania) Julia Sauter	(Austria) Stefanie Pesendorfer	Details
(Estonia) Tallink Hotels Cup	(Estonia) Niina Petrõkina	(Sweden) Josefin Taljegård	(Estonia) Kristina Škuleta-Gromova	Details
(Romania) Bellu Memorial	(Romania) Julia Sauter	(Slovakia) Ema Doboszová	(Bulgaria) Kristina Grigorova	Details
(Netherlands) International Challenge Cup	(Japan) Kaori Sakamoto	(Japan) Mai Mihara	(Japan) Mana Kawabe	Details
(Poland) Maria Olszewska Memorial	(Italy) Marina Piredda	(Poland) Karolina Białas	(Poland) Laura Szczęsna	Details
(Luxembourg) Coupe du Printemps	(Japan) Mone Chiba	(United States) Starr Andrews	(United States) Ava Marie Ziegler	Details
(United Arab Emirates) Abu Dhabi Classic Trophy	(Austria) Stefanie Pesendorfer	(Austria) Jasmine Elsebaie	(Serbia) Antonina Dubinina	Details
(Latvia) Wolmar Spring Cup	(Latvia) Sofja Stepčenko	(Estonia) Kristina Škuleta-Gromova	(Lithuania) Meda Variakojytė	Details
(Slovenia) Triglav Trophy	(Japan) Hana Yoshida	(Japan) Yuna Aoki	(Italy) Ginevra Negrello	Details
Thailand Open Trophy	(Indonesia) Fayrena Azlia Keisha	(Singapore) Loke Xin Yi	No other competitors	Details
(New Zealand) Oceania International	(New Zealand) Danielle Gebser	(Australia) Simone Aubrecht	No other competitors	Details
Mexico Cup	(Mexico) Eugenia Ayelén Garza Martínez	(Mexico) Andrea Astrain Maynez	(Chinese Taipei) Amanda Hsu	Details
(Australia) Hollins Trophy International	(New Zealand) Danielle Gebser	(Australia) Maria Chernyshova	(Australia) Simone Aubrecht	Details

=== Pairs ===
Championships
Event	Gold	Silver	Bronze	Results
(Finland) European Championships	(Italy) Sara Conti / Niccolò Macii	(Italy) Rebecca Ghilardi / Filippo Ambrosini	(Germany) Annika Hocke / Robert Kunkel	Details
(United States) Four Continents Championships	(Japan) Riku Miura / Ryuichi Kihara	(United States) Emily Chan / Spencer Akira Howe	(Canada) Deanna Stellato-Dudek / Maxime Deschamps	Details
(Canada) World Junior Championships	(United States) Sophia Baram / Daniel Tioumentsev	(Australia) Anastasia Golubeva / Hektor Giotopoulos Moore	(Ukraine) Violetta Sierova / Ivan Khobta	Details
(Japan) World Championships	(Japan) Riku Miura / Ryuichi Kihara	(United States) Alexa Knierim / Brandon Frazier	(Italy) Sara Conti / Niccolò Macii	Details

Grand Prix
Event	Gold	Silver	Bronze	Results
(United States) Skate America	(United States) Alexa Knierim / Brandon Frazier	(Canada) Deanna Stellato-Dudek / Maxime Deschamps	(Canada) Kelly Ann Laurin / Loucas Éthier	Details
Skate Canada International	(Japan) Riku Miura / Ryuichi Kihara	(United States) Emily Chan / Spencer Akira Howe	(Italy) Sara Conti / Niccolò Macii	Details
Grand Prix de France	(Canada) Deanna Stellato-Dudek / Maxime Deschamps	(France) Camille Kovalev / Pavel Kovalev	(Germany) Annika Hocke / Robert Kunkel	Details
(United Kingdom) MK John Wilson Trophy	(United States) Alexa Knierim / Brandon Frazier	(Italy) Sara Conti / Niccolò Macii	(Germany) Letizia Roscher / Luis Schuster	Details
(Japan) NHK Trophy	(Japan) Riku Miura / Ryuichi Kihara	(United States) Emily Chan / Spencer Akira Howe	(Canada) Brooke McIntosh / Benjamin Mimar	Details
(Finland) Grand Prix of Espoo	(Italy) Rebecca Ghilardi / Filippo Ambrosini	(Germany) Alisa Efimova / Ruben Blommaert	(Georgia (country)) Anastasiia Metelkina / Daniil Parkman	Details
(Italy) Grand Prix Final	(Japan) Riku Miura / Ryuichi Kihara	(United States) Alexa Knierim / Brandon Frazier	(Italy) Sara Conti / Niccolò Macii	Details

Junior Grand Prix
Event	Gold	Silver	Bronze	Results
JGP Czech Republic	(United States) Sophia Baram / Daniel Tioumentsev	(United States) Cayla Smith / Andy Deng	(Canada) Chloe Panetta / Kieran Thrasher	Details
JGP Latvia	(United States) Cayla Smith / Andy Deng	(Canada) Ava Rae Kemp / Yohnatan Elizarov	(Canada) Ashlyn Schmitz / Tristan Taylor	Details
JGP Poland I	(Australia) Anastasia Golubeva / Hektor Giotopoulos Moore	(Ukraine) Violetta Sierova / Ivan Khobta	(Japan) Haruna Murakami / Sumitada Moriguchi	Details
JGP Poland II	(Australia) Anastasia Golubeva / Hektor Giotopoulos Moore	(Ukraine) Violetta Sierova / Ivan Khobta	(United States) Sophia Baram / Daniel Tioumentsev	Details
(China) JGP Final	(Australia) Anastasia Golubeva / Hektor Giotopoulos Moore	(United States) Sophia Baram / Daniel Tioumentsev	(United States) Cayla Smith / Andy Deng	Details

Challenger Series
Event	Gold	Silver	Bronze	Results
(United States) U.S. International Classic	(Italy) Rebecca Ghilardi / Filippo Ambrosini	(United States) Emily Chan / Spencer Akira Howe	(United States) Valentina Plazas / Maximiliano Fernandez	Details
(Germany) Nebelhorn Trophy	(Canada) Deanna Stellato-Dudek / Maxime Deschamps	(Germany) Alisa Efimova / Ruben Blommaert	(Germany) Annika Hocke / Robert Kunkel	Details
(Finland) Finlandia Trophy	(Germany) Annika Hocke / Robert Kunkel	(Germany) Alisa Efimova / Ruben Blommaert	(Canada) Brooke McIntosh / Benjamin Mimar	Details
(Poland) Warsaw Cup	(Australia) Anastasia Golubeva / Hektor Giotopoulos Moore	(Italy) Rebecca Ghilardi / Filippo Ambrosini	(Germany) Letizia Roscher / Luis Schuster	Details
(Croatia) Golden Spin of Zagreb	(United States) Anastasiia Smirnova / Danylo Siianytsia	(United States) Ellie Kam / Danny O'Shea	(Canada) Lia Pereira / Trennt Michaud	Details

Other international competitions
Event	Gold	Silver	Bronze	Results
(United Kingdom) Britannia Cup	(United Kingdom) Lydia Smart / Harry Mattick	No other competitors		Details
(United States) John Nicks Pairs Challenge	(Italy) Rebecca Ghilardi / Filippo Ambrosini	(United States) Emily Chan / Spencer Akira Howe	(United States) Valentina Plazas / Maximiliano Fernandez	Details
(Italy) Lombardia Trophy	(Italy) Sara Conti / Niccolò Macii	(Italy) Irma Caldara / Riccardo Maglio	(Italy) Anna Valesi / Manuel Piazza	Details
(United Kingdom) Tayside Trophy	(Italy) Sara Conti / Niccolò Macii	(United Kingdom) Anastasia Vaipan-Law / Luke Digby	(Italy) Anna Valesi / Manuel Piazza	Details
(France) Trophée Métropole Nice Côte d'Azur	(Italy) Irma Caldara / Riccardo Maglio	(Philippines) Isabella Gamez / Alexander Korovin	(France) Oxana Vouillamoz / Flavien Giniaux	Details
(Austria) Ice Challenge	(United States) Ellie Kam / Danny O'Shea	(Netherlands) Nika Osipova / Dmitry Epstein	(Ukraine) Violetta Sierova / Ivan Khobta	Details
(Germany) Bavarian Open	(Hungary) Maria Pavlova / Alexei Sviatchenko	(Netherlands) Daria Danilova / Michel Tsiba	(Czech Republic) Federica Simioli / Alessandro Zarbo	Details
(Netherlands) International Challenge Cup	(Italy) Sara Conti / Niccolò Macii	(Hungary) Maria Pavlova / Alexei Sviatchenko	(Netherlands) Nika Osipova / Dmitry Epstein	Details

=== Ice dance ===
Championships
Event	Gold	Silver	Bronze	Results
(Finland) European Championships	(Italy) Charlène Guignard / Marco Fabbri	(United Kingdom) Lilah Fear / Lewis Gibson	(Finland) Juulia Turkkila / Matthias Versluis	Details
(United States) Four Continents Championships	(United States) Madison Chock / Evan Bates	(Canada) Laurence Fournier Beaudry / Nikolaj Sørensen	(Canada) Marjorie Lajoie / Zachary Lagha	Details
(Canada) World Junior Championships	(Czech Republic) Kateřina Mrázková / Daniel Mrázek	(South Korea) Hannah Lim / Ye Quan	(Canada) Nadiia Bashynska / Peter Beaumont	Details
(Japan) World Championships	(United States) Madison Chock / Evan Bates	(Italy) Charlène Guignard / Marco Fabbri	(Canada) Piper Gilles / Paul Poirier	Details

Grand Prix
Event	Gold	Silver	Bronze	Results
(United States) Skate America	(United States) Madison Chock / Evan Bates	(United States) Kaitlin Hawayek / Jean-Luc Baker	(Canada) Marie-Jade Lauriault / Romain Le Gac	Details
Skate Canada International	(Canada) Piper Gilles / Paul Poirier	(United Kingdom) Lilah Fear / Lewis Gibson	(Canada) Marjorie Lajoie / Zachary Lagha	Details
Grand Prix de France	(Italy) Charlène Guignard / Marco Fabbri	(Canada) Laurence Fournier Beaudry / Nikolaj Sørensen	(France) Evgeniia Lopareva / Geoffrey Brissaud	Details
(United Kingdom) MK John Wilson Trophy	(Italy) Charlène Guignard / Marco Fabbri	(United Kingdom) Lilah Fear / Lewis Gibson	(Canada) Marjorie Lajoie / Zachary Lagha	Details
(Japan) NHK Trophy	(Canada) Laurence Fournier Beaudry / Nikolaj Sørensen	(United States) Madison Chock / Evan Bates	(United States) Caroline Green / Michael Parsons	Details
(Finland) Grand Prix of Espoo	(Canada) Piper Gilles / Paul Poirier	(United States) Kaitlin Hawayek / Jean-Luc Baker	(Finland) Juulia Turkkila / Matthias Versluis	Details
(Italy) Grand Prix Final	(Canada) Piper Gilles / Paul Poirier	(United States) Madison Chock / Evan Bates	(Italy) Charlène Guignard / Marco Fabbri	Details

Junior Grand Prix
Event	Gold	Silver	Bronze	Results
JGP France	(South Korea) Hannah Lim / Ye Quan	(France) Célina Fradji / Jean-Hans Fourneaux	(United States) Vanessa Pham / Jonathan Rogers	Details
JGP Czech Republic	(Czech Republic) Kateřina Mrázková / Daniel Mrázek	(United Kingdom) Phebe Bekker / James Hernandez	(Japan) Nao Kida / Masaya Morita	Details
JGP Latvia	(Germany) Darya Grimm / Michail Savitskiy	(Canada) Sandrine Gauthier / Quentin Thieren	(Ukraine) Mariia Pinchuk / Mykyta Pogorielov	Details
JGP Poland I	(Canada) Nadiia Bashynska / Peter Beaumont	(United Kingdom) Phebe Bekker / James Hernandez	(France) Célina Fradji / Jean-Hans Fourneaux	Details
JGP Poland II	(Canada) Nadiia Bashynska / Peter Beaumont	(Germany) Darya Grimm / Michail Savitskiy	(Canada) Jordyn Lewis / Noah McMillan	Details
JGP Italy	(Czech Republic) Kateřina Mrázková / Daniel Mrázek	(South Korea) Hannah Lim / Ye Quan	(United States) Leah Neset / Artem Markelov	Details
(China) JGP Final	(Canada) Nadiia Bashynska / Peter Beaumont	(South Korea) Hannah Lim / Ye Quan	(Czech Republic) Kateřina Mrázková / Daniel Mrázek	Details

Challenger Series
Event	Gold	Silver	Bronze	Results
(United States) U.S. International Classic	(United Kingdom) Lilah Fear / Lewis Gibson	(United States) Eva Pate / Logan Bye	(United States) Lorraine McNamara / Anton Spiridonov	Details
(Italy) Lombardia Trophy	(Italy) Charlène Guignard / Marco Fabbri	(Lithuania) Allison Reed / Saulius Ambrulevičius	(Czech Republic) Natálie Taschlerová / Filip Taschler	Details
(Germany) Nebelhorn Trophy	(United Kingdom) Lilah Fear / Lewis Gibson	(Lithuania) Allison Reed / Saulius Ambrulevičius	(Canada) Carolane Soucisse / Shane Firus	Details
(Slovakia) Nepela Memorial	(Canada) Marjorie Lajoie / Zachary Lagha	(United States) Eva Pate / Logan Bye	(France) Marie Dupayage / Thomas Nabais	Details
(Finland) Finlandia Trophy	(Canada) Laurence Fournier Beaudry / Nikolaj Sørensen	(United States) Kaitlin Hawayek / Jean-Luc Baker	(Finland) Juulia Turkkila / Matthias Versluis	Details
(Hungary) Budapest Trophy	(Canada) Marjorie Lajoie / Zachary Lagha	(France) Evgeniia Lopareva / Geoffrey Brissaud	(United States) Katarina Wolfkostin / Jeffrey Chen	Details
(Kazakhstan) Denis Ten Memorial Challenge	(Japan) Kana Muramoto / Daisuke Takahashi	(Germany) Jennifer Janse van Rensburg / Benjamin Steffan	(Hungary) Mariia Ignateva / Danijil Szemko	Details
(Austria) Ice Challenge	(United States) Emily Bratti / Ian Somerville	(France) Natacha Lagouge / Arnaud Caffa	(Canada) Lily Hensen / Nathan Lickers	Details
(Poland) Warsaw Cup	(France) Loïcia Demougeot / Théo Le Mercier	(Germany) Jennifer Janse van Rensburg / Benjamin Steffan	(France) Marie Dupayage / Thomas Nabais	Details
(Croatia) Golden Spin of Zagreb	(United States) Christina Carreira / Anthony Ponomarenko	(Lithuania) Allison Reed / Saulius Ambrulevičius	(United States) Emilea Zingas / Vadym Kolesnik	Details

Other international competitions
Event	Gold	Silver	Bronze	Results
(United States) Lake Placid Ice Dance International	(United States) Lorraine McNamara / Anton Spiridonov	(United States) Eva Pate / Logan Bye	(United States) Katarina Wolfkostin / Jeffrey Chen	Details
(United Kingdom) Britannia Cup	(United Kingdom) Lilah Fear / Lewis Gibson	(France) Natacha Lagouge / Arnaud Caffa	(Australia) Holly Harris / Jason Chan	Details
(France) Trophée Métropole Nice Côte d'Azur	(Finland) Juulia Turkkila / Matthias Versluis	(France) Marie Dupayage / Thomas Nabais	(France) Natacha Lagouge / Arnaud Caffa	Details
(Italy) Mezzaluna Cup	(Italy) Victoria Manni / Carlo Röthlisberger	(Italy) Carolina Portesi Peroni / Michael Chrastecky	(Czech Republic) Denisa Cimlová / Joti Polizoakis	Details
(Czech Republic) Pavel Roman Memorial	(Czech Republic) Denisa Cimlová / Joti Polizoakis	(Italy) Carolina Portesi Peroni / Michael Chrastecky	(Ukraine) Mariia Pinchuk / Mykyta Pogorielov	Details
Open d'Andorra	(Italy) Leia Dozzi / Pietro Papetti	(Australia) India Nette / Eron Westwood	No other competitors	Details
(Germany) NRW Trophy	(Georgia (country)) Maria Kazakova / Georgy Reviya	(Poland) Anastasia Polibina / Pavel Golovishnikov	(Germany) Charise Matthaei / Max Liebers	Details
(Hungary) Santa Claus Cup	(Australia) Holly Harris / Jason Chan	(Hungary) Mariia Ignateva / Danijil Szemko	(United States) Lorraine McNamara / Anton Spiridonov	Details
(Turkey) Bosphorus Cup	(Poland) Anastasia Polibina / Pavel Golovishnikov	(Ukraine) Mariia Pinchuk / Mykyta Pogorielov	(France) Lou Terreaux / Noé Perron	Details
(United States) Winter World University Games	(France) Marie Dupayage / Thomas Nabais	(United States) Lorraine McNamara / Anton Spiridonov	(France) Natacha Lagouge / Arnaud Caffa	Details
(Germany) Bavarian Open	(Germany) Jennifer Janse van Rensburg / Benjamin Steffan	(Finland) Yuka Orihara / Juho Pirinen	(France) Natacha Lagouge / Arnaud Caffa	Details
(Italy) Egna Dance Trophy	(Italy) Victoria Manni / Carlo Röthlisberger	(Italy) Leia Dozzi / Pietro Papetti	(Germany) Charise Matthaei / Max Liebers	Details
(Netherlands) International Challenge Cup	(France) Evgeniia Lopareva / Geoffrey Brissaud	(France) Loïcia Demougeot / Théo Le Mercier	(Finland) Yuka Orihara / Juho Pirinen	Details
(Poland) Maria Olszewska Memorial	(Poland) Olexandra Borysova / Aaron Freeman	No other competitors		Details

== Records and achievements ==
=== Records ===
Prior to the 2022–23 season, the ISU record scores were as follows:

Level	Segment	Disc.											
Level	Segment	Men's singles			Women's singles			Pairs			Ice dance		
Level	Segment	Skater	Score	Event	Skater	Score	Event	Team	Score	Event	Team	Score	Event
Senior	Short program / Rhythm dance	(United States) Nathan Chen	113.97	2022 Winter Olympics	(Russia) Kamila Valieva	87.42	2021 Rostelecom Cup	(China) Sui Wenjing / Han Cong	84.41	2022 Winter Olympics	(France) Gabriella Papadakis / Guillaume Cizeron	92.73	2022 World Championships
Senior	Free skating / Free dance	(United States) Nathan Chen	224.92	2019–20 Grand Prix Final	(Russia) Kamila Valieva	185.29	2021 Rostelecom Cup	(Russia) Anastasia Mishina / Aleksandr Galliamov	157.46	2022 European Championships	(France) Gabriella Papadakis / Guillaume Cizeron	137.09	2022 World Championships
Senior	Total score	(United States) Nathan Chen	335.30	2019–20 Grand Prix Final	(Russia) Kamila Valieva	272.71	2021 Rostelecom Cup	(China) Sui Wenjing / Han Cong	239.88	2022 Winter Olympics	(France) Gabriella Papadakis / Guillaume Cizeron	229.82	2022 World Championships
Junior	Short program / Rhythm dance	(United States) Ilia Malinin	88.99	2022 World Junior Championships	(Russia) Alena Kostornaia	76.32	2018–19 JGP Final	(Russia) Apollinariia Panfilova / Dmitry Rylov	73.71	2020 World Junior Championships	(Canada) Marjorie Lajoie / Zachary Lagha	70.14	2019 World Junior Championships
Junior	Free skating / Free dance	(United States) Ilia Malinin	187.12	2022 World Junior Championships	(Russia) Sofia Akateva	157.19	2021 JGP Russia	(Russia) Apollinariia Panfilova / Dmitry Rylov	127.47	2020 Winter Youth Olympics	(United States) Avonley Nguyen / Vadym Kolesnik	108.91	2020 World Junior Championships
Junior	Total score	(United States) Ilia Malinin	276.11	2022 World Junior Championships	(Russia) Sofia Akateva	233.08	2021 JGP Russia	(Russia) Apollinariia Panfilova / Dmitry Rylov	199.21	2020 Winter Youth Olympics	(United States) Avonley Nguyen / Vadym Kolesnik	177.18	2020 World Junior Championships

The following new senior ISU best scores were set during this season:

Disc.	Segment	Skater(s)	Score	Event	Date	Ref.
Ice dance	Rhythm dance	(United States) Madison Chock / Evan Bates	93.91	2023 World Team Trophy	April 13, 2023	
Ice dance	Free dance	(United States) Madison Chock / Evan Bates	138.41	2023 World Team Trophy	April 14, 2023	
Ice dance	Combined total	(United States) Madison Chock / Evan Bates	232.32	2023 World Team Trophy	April 14, 2023	

The following new junior ISU best scores were set during this season:

Disc.	Segment	Skater(s)	Score	Event	Date	Ref.
Ice dance	Rhythm dance	(Czech Republic) Kateřina Mrázková / Daniel Mrázek	71.87	2022 JGP Italy	October 13, 2022	
Ice dance	Combined total	(Czech Republic) Kateřina Mrázková / Daniel Mrázek	177.36	2023 World Junior Championships	March 4, 2023	

=== Achievements ===
- At the 2023 European Championships, Sara Conti and Niccolò Macii were the first Italian pair team to win a gold medal at an ISU Championship event.
- At the 2023 European Championships, Anastasiia Gubanova was the first Georgian skater to win a gold medal at a senior-level ISU Championship event.
- At the 2023 European Championships, Loena Hendrickx was the first Belgian women's singles skater to win a medal (a silver medal) at the European Championships.
- At the 2023 Four Continents Championships, Riku Miura and Ryuichi Kihara were the first Japanese pair team to win a gold medal at an ISU Championship event. They were also the first Japanese pair team to win any medal at the Four Continents Championships.
- At the 2023 World Junior Championships, Kateřina Mrázková and Daniel Mrázek were the first Czech ice dance team to win a gold medal at an ISU Championship event.
- At the 2023 World Junior Championships, Hannah Lim and Ye Quan were the first South Korean and the first Asian ice dance team to win a medal (a silver medal) at the World Junior Championships.
- At the 2023 World Junior Championships, Naoki Rossi earned the highest placement (a silver medal) for a Swiss men's singles skater at the World Junior Championships.
- At the 2023 World Championships, Riku Miura and Ryuichi Kihara were the first Japanese pair team to win a gold medal at the World Championships.
- At the 2023 World Championships, Sara Conti and Niccolò Macii were the first Italian pair team to win a medal (a bronze medal) at the World Championships.
- At the 2023 World Championships, Kaori Sakamoto was the first Japanese skater to win two consecutive gold medals at the World Championships, having previously won the gold medal at the 2022 World Championships.
- At the 2023 World Championships, Cha Jun-hwan was the first Korean men's singles skater to win a medal (a silver medal) at the World Championships.
- At the 2022 U.S. Classic, Ilia Malinin was the first skater to successfully land a quadruple Axel in international competition.

== Season's best scores ==
=== Men's singles ===
Top 10 season's best scores in the men's combined total
No.	Skater	Nation	Score	Event
1	Shoma Uno	Japan	304.46	2022–23 Grand Prix Final
2	Cha Jun-hwan	South Korea	296.03	2023 World Championships
3	Ilia Malinin	United States	288.44	2023 World Championships
4	Kévin Aymoz	France	282.97	2023 World Championships
5	Kao Miura	Japan	281.53	2023 Four Continents Championships
6	Jason Brown	United States	280.04	2023 World Championships
7	Keegan Messing	Canada	275.57	2023 Four Continents Championships
8	Matteo Rizzo	Italy	275.36	2023 World Team Trophy
9	Sōta Yamamoto	Japan	274.35	2022–23 Grand Prix Final
10	Kazuki Tomono	Japan	273.41	2023 World Championships

Top 10 season's best scores in the men's short program
No.	Skater	Nation	Score	Event
1	Ilia Malinin	United States	105.90	2023 World Team Trophy
2	Shoma Uno	Japan	104.63	2023 World Championships
3	Cha Jun-hwan	South Korea	101.33	2023 World Team Trophy
4	Kévin Aymoz	France	100.58	2023 World Team Trophy
5	Keegan Messing	Canada	98.75	2023 World Championships
6	Adam Siao Him Fa	France	96.53	2023 European Championships
7	Sōta Yamamoto	Japan	96.49	2022 NHK Trophy
8	Jason Brown	United States	95.61	2023 World Team Trophy
9	Kao Miura	Japan	94.96	2022 Skate America
10	Kazuki Tomono	Japan	92.68	2023 World Championships

Top 10 season's best scores in the men's free skating
No.	Skater	Nation	Score	Event
1	Shoma Uno	Japan	204.47	2022–23 Grand Prix Final
2	Cha Jun-hwan	South Korea	196.39	2023 World Championships
3	Ilia Malinin	United States	194.29	2022 Skate America
4	Kao Miura	Japan	189.63	2023 Four Continents Championships
5	Keegan Messing	Canada	188.87	2023 Four Continents Championships
6	Kévin Aymoz	France	187.41	2023 World Championships
7	Matteo Rizzo	Italy	187.35	2023 World Team Trophy
8	Jason Brown	United States	185.87	2023 World Championships
9	Daniel Grassl	Italy	181.32	2022 Warsaw Cup
10	Adam Siao Him Fa	France	180.98	2022 Grand Prix de France

=== Women's singles ===
Top 10 season's best scores in the women's combined total
No.	Skater	Nation	Score	Event
1	Lee Hae-in	South Korea	225.47	2023 World Team Trophy
2	Kaori Sakamoto	Japan	224.61	2023 World Championships
3	Mao Shimada	Japan	224.54	2023 World Junior Championships
4	Mai Mihara	Japan	217.43	2022 MK John Wilson Trophy
5	Loena Hendrickx	Belgium	216.34	2022 Grand Prix de France
6	Isabeau Levito	United States	215.74	2022 MK John Wilson Trophy
7	Kim Ye-lim	South Korea	213.97	2022 Finlandia Trophy
8	Rinka Watanabe	Japan	213.14	2022 Lombardia Trophy
9	Hana Yoshida	Japan	208.31	2022 JGP Italy
10	Ami Nakai	Japan	205.90	2022 JGP Poland II

Top 10 season's best scores in the women's short program
No.	Skater	Nation	Score	Event
1	Kaori Sakamoto	Japan	79.24	2023 World Championships
2	Lee Hae-in	South Korea	76.90	2023 World Team Trophy
3	Loena Hendrickx	Belgium	76.19	2022 Nebelhorn Trophy
4	Mai Mihara	Japan	74.58	2022–23 Grand Prix Final
5	Isabeau Levito	United States	73.03	2023 World Championships
6	Kim Ye-lim	South Korea	72.84	2023 Four Continents Championships
7	Rinka Watanabe	Japan	72.58	2022–23 Grand Prix Final
8	Mao Shimada	Japan	71.78	2023 World Junior Championships
9	Kim Chae-yeon	South Korea	71.39	2023 Four Continents Championships
10	Shin Ji-a	South Korea	71.19	2023 World Junior Championships

Top 10 season's best scores in the women's free skating
No.	Skater	Nation	Score	Event
1	Mao Shimada	Japan	152.76	2023 World Junior Championships
2	Lee Hae-in	South Korea	148.57	2023 World Team Trophy
3	Rinka Watanabe	Japan	146.31	2022 Lombardia Trophy
4	Kaori Sakamoto	Japan	145.89	2022 Skate America
5	Mai Mihara	Japan	145.20	2022 MK John Wilson Trophy
6	Isabeau Levito	United States	143.68	2022 MK John Wilson Trophy
7	Loena Hendrickx	Belgium	143.59	2022 Grand Prix de France
7	Kim Ye-lim	South Korea	143.59	2023 World Team Trophy
9	Hana Yoshida	Japan	141.42	2022 JGP Italy
10	Kim Chae-yeon	South Korea	139.45	2023 World Championships

=== Pairs ===
Top 10 season's best scores in the pairs' combined total
No.	Team	Nation	Score	Event
1	Alexa Knierim / Brandon Frazier	United States	230.12	2023 World Team Trophy
2	Riku Miura / Ryuichi Kihara	Japan	224.16	2023 World Team Trophy
3	Sara Conti / Niccolò Macii	Italy	208.08	2023 World Championships
4	Emily Chan / Spencer Akira Howe	United States	201.11	2023 Four Continents Championships
5	Deanna Stellato-Dudek / Maxime Deschamps	Canada	199.97	2023 World Championships
6	Lia Pereira / Trennt Michaud	Canada	193.00	2023 World Championships
7	Maria Pavlova / Alexei Sviatchenko	Hungary	190.67	2023 World Championships
8	Rebecca Ghilardi / Filippo Ambrosini	Italy	189.74	2022 Grand Prix of Espoo
9	Anastasia Golubeva / Hektor Giotopoulos Moore	Australia	189.47	2023 World Championships
10	Alisa Efimova / Ruben Blommaert	Germany	186.17	2022 Nebelhorn Trophy

Top 10 season's best scores in the pairs' short program
No.	Team	Nation	Score	Event
1	Alexa Knierim / Brandon Frazier	United States	82.25	2023 World Team Trophy
2	Riku Miura / Ryuichi Kihara	Japan	80.72	2023 World Championships
3	Sara Conti / Niccolò Macii	Italy	73.24	2023 World Championships
4	Deanna Stellato-Dudek / Maxime Deschamps	Canada	73.05	2022 Skate America
5	Emily Chan / Spencer Akira Howe	United States	70.23	2023 World Championships
6	Annika Hocke / Robert Kunkel	Germany	69.13	2022 Nebelhorn Trophy
7	Rebecca Ghilardi / Filippo Ambrosini	Italy	67.31	2022 Grand Prix of Espoo
8	Alisa Efimova / Ruben Blommaert	Germany	67.05	2022 Nebelhorn Trophy
9	Sophia Baram / Daniel Tioumentsev	United States	66.95	2023 World Junior Championships
10	Lia Pereira / Trennt Michaud	Canada	65.31	2023 World Championships

Top 10 season's best scores in the pairs' free skating
No.	Team	Nation	Score	Event
1	Alexa Knierim / Brandon Frazier	United States	147.87	2023 World Team Trophy
2	Riku Miura / Ryuichi Kihara	Japan	143.69	2023 World Team Trophy
3	Sara Conti / Niccolò Macii	Italy	134.84	2023 World Championships
4	Emily Chan / Spencer Akira Howe	United States	134.15	2023 Four Continents Championships
5	Deanna Stellato-Dudek / Maxime Deschamps	Canada	129.73	2023 World Team Trophy
6	Lia Pereira / Trennt Michaud	Canada	127.69	2023 World Championships
7	Anastasia Golubeva / Hektor Giotopoulos Moore	Australia	127.52	2023 World Championships
8	Rebecca Ghilardi / Filippo Ambrosini	Italy	127.48	2023 European Championships
9	Maria Pavlova / Alexei Sviatchenko	Hungary	126.24	2023 World Championships
10	Annika Hocke / Robert Kunkel	Germany	123.71	2023 World Championships

=== Ice dance ===
Top 10 season's best scores in the combined total (ice dance)
No.	Team	Nation	Score	Event
1	Madison Chock / Evan Bates	United States	232.32	2023 World Team Trophy
2	Charlène Guignard / Marco Fabbri	Italy	223.24	2023 World Team Trophy
3	Piper Gilles / Paul Poirier	Canada	219.49	2022 Grand Prix of Espoo
4	Lilah Fear / Lewis Gibson	Great Britain	214.73	2023 World Championships
5	Laurence Fournier Beaudry / Nikolaj Sørensen	Canada	214.08	2023 Four Continents Championships
6	Kaitlin Hawayek / Jean-Luc Baker	United States	202.46	2022 Grand Prix of Espoo
7	Marjorie Lajoie / Zachary Lagha	Canada	202.40	2022 Budapest Trophy
8	Caroline Green / Michael Parsons	United States	201.44	2023 World Championships
9	Allison Reed / Saulius Ambrulevičius	Lithuania	199.20	2023 World Championships
10	Juulia Turkkila / Matthias Versluis	Finland	198.21	2023 European Championships

Top 10 season's best scores in the rhythm dance
No.	Team	Nation	Score	Event
1	Madison Chock / Evan Bates	United States	93.91	2023 World Team Trophy
2	Charlène Guignard / Marco Fabbri	Italy	90.90	2023 World Team Trophy
3	Piper Gilles / Paul Poirier	Canada	88.37	2023 World Team Trophy
4	Lilah Fear / Lewis Gibson	Great Britain	86.56	2023 World Championships
5	Laurence Fournier Beaudry / Nikolaj Sørensen	Canada	86.28	2023 Four Continents Championships
6	Marjorie Lajoie / Zachary Lagha	Canada	82.09	2022 Budapest Trophy
7	Kaitlin Hawayek / Jean-Luc Baker	United States	80.93	2022 Grand Prix of Espoo
8	Kana Muramoto / Daisuke Takahashi	Japan	79.56	2022 Denis Ten Memorial Challenge
9	Allison Reed / Saulius Ambrulevičius	Lithuania	78.98	2022 Nebelhorn Trophy
10	Caroline Green / Michael Parsons	United States	78.74	2023 World Championships

Top 10 season's best scores in the free dance
No.	Team	Nation	Score	Event
1	Madison Chock / Evan Bates	United States	138.41	2023 World Team Trophy
2	Charlène Guignard / Marco Fabbri	Italy	132.34	2023 World Team Trophy
3	Piper Gilles / Paul Poirier	Canada	131.69	2022 Grand Prix of Espoo
4	Laurence Fournier Beaudry / Nikolaj Sørensen	Canada	128.45	2023 World Championships
5	Lilah Fear / Lewis Gibson	Great Britain	128.17	2023 World Championships
6	Kaitlin Hawayek / Jean-Luc Baker	United States	122.95	2022 Skate America
7	Caroline Green / Michael Parsons	United States	122.70	2023 World Championships
8	Marjorie Lajoie / Zachary Lagha	Canada	120.96	2023 Four Continents Championships
9	Juulia Turkkila / Matthias Versluis	Finland	120.65	2023 European Championships
10	Allison Reed / Saulius Ambrulevičius	Lithuania	120.50	2023 World Championships

== World standings ==
=== Men's singles ===
As of March 25, 2023.

No.	Skater	Nation
1	Shoma Uno	Japan
2	Ilia Malinin	United States
3	Cha Jun-hwan	South Korea
4	Daniel Grassl	Italy
5	Adam Siao Him Fa	France
6	Matteo Rizzo	Italy
7	Kazuki Tomono	Japan
8	Keegan Messing	Canada
9	Deniss Vasiļjevs	Latvia
10	Yuma Kagiyama	Japan

=== Women's singles ===
As of March 24, 2023.

No.	Skater	Nation
1	Kaori Sakamoto	Japan
2	Loena Hendrickx	Belgium
3	Mai Mihara	Japan
4	Lee Hae-in	South Korea
5	Isabeau Levito	United States
6	Kim Ye-lim	South Korea
7	Anna Shcherbakova	Russia
8	Anastasiia Gubanova	Georgia
9	You Young	South Korea
10	Ekaterina Kurakova	Poland

=== Pairs ===
As of March 23, 2023.

No.	Team	Nation
1	Alexa Knierim / Brandon Frazier	United States
2	Riku Miura / Ryuichi Kihara	Japan
3	Rebecca Ghilardi / Filippo Ambrosini	Italy
4	Sara Conti / Niccolò Macii	Italy
5	Emily Chan / Spencer Akira Howe	United States
6	Evgenia Tarasova / Vladimir Morozov	Russia
7	Deanna Stellato-Dudek / Maxime Deschamps	Canada
8	Anastasia Mishina / Aleksandr Galliamov	Russia
9	Sui Wenjing / Han Cong	China
10	Aleksandra Boikova / Dmitrii Kozlovskii	Russia

=== Ice dance ===
As of March 25, 2023.

No.	Team	Nation
1	Charlène Guignard / Marco Fabbri	Italy
2	Madison Chock / Evan Bates	United States
3	Lilah Fear / Lewis Gibson	Great Britain
4	Piper Gilles / Paul Poirier	Canada
5	Laurence Fournier Beaudry / Nikolaj Sørensen	Canada
6	Caroline Green / Michael Parsons	United States
7	Marjorie Lajoie / Zachary Lagha	Canada
8	Juulia Turkkila / Matthias Versluis	Finland
9	Christina Carreira / Anthony Ponomarenko	United States
10	Allison Reed / Saulius Ambrulevičius	Lithuania

== Current season's world rankings ==
=== Men's singles ===
As of May 2, 2023.

No.	Skater	Nation
1	Shoma Uno	Japan
2	Ilia Malinin	United States
3	Cha Jun-hwan	South Korea
4	Adam Siao Him Fa	France
5	Matteo Rizzo	Italy
6	Shun Sato	Japan
7	Kévin Aymoz	France
8	Kao Miura	Japan
9	Lukas Britschgi	Switzerland
10	Daniel Grassl	Italy

=== Women's singles ===
As of May 2, 2023.

No.	Skater	Nation
1	Kaori Sakamoto	Japan
2	Isabeau Levito	United States
3	Loena Hendrickx	Belgium
4	Kim Ye-lim	South Korea
5	Mai Mihara	Japan
6	Lee Hae-in	South Korea
7	Rinka Watanabe	Japan
8	Ekaterina Kurakova	Poland
9	Anastasiia Gubanova	Georgia
10	Kimmy Repond	Switzerland

=== Pairs ===
As of March 23, 2023.

No.	Team	Nation
1	Sara Conti / Niccolò Macii	Italy
2	Riku Miura / Ryuichi Kihara	Japan
3	Rebecca Ghilardi / Filippo Ambrosini	Italy
4	Alexa Knierim / Brandon Frazier	United States
5	Deanna Stellato-Dudek / Maxime Deschamps	Canada
6	Emily Chan / Spencer Akira Howe	United States
7	Annika Hocke / Robert Kunkel	Germany
8	Alisa Efimova / Ruben Blommaert	Germany
9	Valentina Plazas / Maximiliano Fernandez	United States
10	Anastasia Golubeva / Hektor Giotopoulos Moore	Australia

=== Ice dance ===
As of March 25, 2023.

No.	Team	Nation
1	Charlène Guignard / Marco Fabbri	Italy
2	Lilah Fear / Lewis Gibson	Great Britain
3	Madison Chock / Evan Bates	United States
4	Piper Gilles / Paul Poirier	Canada
5	Laurence Fournier Beaudry / Nikolaj Sørensen	Canada
6	Marjorie Lajoie / Zachary Lagha	Canada
7	Juulia Turkkila / Matthias Versluis	Finland
8	Evgeniia Lopareva / Geoffrey Brissaud	France
9	Natálie Taschlerová / Filip Taschler	Czech Republic
10	Loïcia Demougeot / Théo le Mercier	France
