= Figure skating at the 2023 European Youth Olympic Winter Festival =

- Date: 25 – 27 January
- Season: 2022–23
- Location: Pontebba, Italy
- Host: Italian Ice Sports Federation
- Venue: Ice Stadium "Claudio Vuerich"

Champions
- Men's singles: (Israel) Nikita Sheiko
- Women's singles: (Finland) Iida Karhunen
- Previous: 2022 European Youth Olympic Winter Festival
- Next: 2025 European Youth Olympic Winter Festival

Figure skating at the 2023 European Youth Olympic Winter Festival was held from 25 to 27 January 2023 at the Ice Stadium "Claudio Vuerich" in Pontebba, Italy. Medals were awarded in boys' and girls' singles. To be eligible, skaters must have been born between 1 July 2006 and 30 June 2008.

Russia and Belarus did not participate.

== Schedule ==
Date	Discipline	Time	Segment
Wednesday, 25 January	Girls	12:00	Short program
Wednesday, 25 January	Boys	16:45	Short program
Thursday, 26 January	Boys	15:45	Free skating
Friday, 27 January	Girls	13:00	Free skating
All times are listed in local time (UTC+01:00).

== Medal summary ==
=== Medalists ===
Event	Gold	Silver	Bronze
Boys	Nikita Sheiko; Israel	Konstantin Supatashvili; Georgia	Naoki Rossi; Switzerland
Girls	Iida Karhunen; Finland	Anna Pezzetta; Italy	Noelle Streuli; Poland

=== Medals by country ===
Rank	Nation	Gold	Silver	Bronze	Total
1	Finland	1	0	0	1
1	Israel	1	0	0	1
3	Georgia	0	1	0	1
3	Italy	0	1	0	1
5	Poland	0	0	1	1
5	Switzerland	0	0	1	1
Totals (6 entries)		2	2	2	6

== Entries ==
Member nations and their respective Olympic committees began announcing entries in October 2022. The complete list of entries was published on 22 January 2023.

Country	Men	Women
Armenia	Semen Daniliants	
Austria		Flora Marie Schaller
Azerbaijan		Sabina Alieva
Bosnia and Herzegovina		Lana Galijasevic
Bulgaria		Chiara Hristova
Croatia		Meri Marinac
Cyprus		Stefania Yakovleva
Denmark		Camilla Poulsen
Estonia		Amalia Zelenjak
Finland	Matias Lindfors	Iida Karhunen
France	Jean Medard	Ève Dubecq
Georgia	Konstantin Supatashvili	
Germany	Hugo Willi Hermann	Olesya Ray
Great Britain	Arin Yorke	Arabella Sear-Watkins
Greece		Stella Makri
Hungary		Katinka Anna Zsembery
Iceland		Freydis Jona Jing Bergsveinsdottir
Israel	Nikita Sheiko	Mariia Dmitrieva
Italy		Anna Pezzetta
Latvia	Kirills Korkacs	Nikola Fomchenkova
Lithuania	Daniel Korabelnik	Daria Afinogenova
Moldova		Maria Gribinic
Netherlands		Nerea Mur
North Macedonia		Milena Milojevikj
Norway		Pernille With
Poland	Pavlo Klimin	Noelle Streuli
Romania	Andrei Tudor Dominic	
Slovakia	Lukáš Václavík	Vanesa Šelmeková
Slovenia		Klara Sekardi
Spain	Andre Zapata Casares	
Sweden		Nina Fredriksson
Switzerland	Naoki Rossi	Elina Plüss
Turkey	Furkan Emre Incel	Azra Ulus
Ukraine	Mark Kulish	Anastasiia Vasylchenko

== Results ==
=== Boys ===
Rank	Name	Nation	Total points	SP		FS	
1	Nikita Sheiko	Israel	190.98	4	67.69	2	123.29
2	Konstantin Supatashvili	Georgia	189.00	5	65.12	1	123.88
3	Naoki Rossi	Switzerland	185.51	2	68.88	4	116.63
4	Semen Daniliants	Armenia	181.79	3	67.90	6	113.89
5	Hugo Willi Hermann	Germany	180.84	7	61.02	3	119.82
6	Matias Lindfors	Finland	177.10	6	61.33	5	115.77
7	Lukáš Václavík	Slovakia	160.03	1	69.51	8	90.52
8	Furkan Emre Incel	Turkey	146.93	8	53.06	7	93.87
9	Mark Kulish	Ukraine	137.53	11	49.04	9	88.49
10	Kirills Korkacs	Latvia	134.40	9	49.34	10	85.06
11	Daniel Korabelnik	Lithuania	133.14	10	49.26	11	83.88
12	Jean Medard	France	130.14	12	47.10	13	83.04
13	Andre Zapata Casares	Spain	123.29	15	39.89	12	83.4
14	Arin Yorke	Great Britain	122.74	13	42.41	15	80.33
15	Pavlo Klimin	Poland	118.60	16	36.93	14	81.67
16	Andrei Tudor Dominic	Romania	106.13	14	40.61	16	65.52

=== Girls ===
Rank	Name	Nation	Total points	SP		FS	
1	Iida Karhunen	Finland	171.79	1	57.37	1	114.42
2	Anna Pezzetta	Italy	167.96	2	56.28	2	111.68
3	Noelle Streuli	Poland	162.34	4	53.67	3	108.67
4	Olesya Ray	Germany	150.47	3	54.36	5	96.11
5	Nikola Fomcenkova	Latvia	143.56	12	44.58	4	98.98
6	Amalia Zelenjak	Estonia	143.03	5	51.58	6	91.45
7	Katinka Anna Zsembery	Hungary	141.67	6	50.55	7	91.12
8	Nina Fredriksson	Sweden	129.92	15	42.25	8	87.67
9	Ève Dubecq	France	127.83	9	45.69	11	82.14
10	Mariia Dmitrieva	Israel	126.56	7	47.19	13	79.37
11	Stefania Yakovleva	Cyprus	125.7	17	41.36	9	84.34
12	Anastasiia Vasylchenko	Ukraine	124.95	13	42.73	10	82.22
13	Elina Pluss	Switzerland	117.6	8	46.12	16	71.48
14	Pernille With	Norway	117.07	18	38.44	14	78.63
15	Sabina Alieva	Azerbaijan	116.38	10	45.27	18	71.11
16	Vanesa Šelmeková	Slovakia	115.69	24	35.28	12	80.41
17	Camilla Poulsen	Denmark	113.18	14	42.65	20	70.53
18	Daria Afinogenova	Lithuania	113.18	11	45.17	22	68.01
19	Arabella Sear-Watkins	Great Britain	112.65	16	41.44	17	71.21
20	Flora Marie Schaller	Austria	111.13	21	37.52	15	73.61
21	Nerea Mur	Netherlands	107.84	19	37.94	21	69.9
22	Meri Marinac	Croatia	107.07	23	36.14	19	70.93
23	Stella Makri	Greece	105.09	20	37.53	23	67.56
24	Azra Ulus	Turkey	93.42	26	30.48	24	62.94
25	Maria Gribinic	Moldova	90.7	27	28.59	25	62.11
26	Klara Sekardi	Slovenia	82.86	25	33.63	27	49.23
27	Freydís Jóna Jing Bergsveinsdóttir	Iceland	76.86	28	25.20	26	51.66
28	Lana Galijašević	Bosnia and Herzegovina	67.41	30	20.89	28	46.52
29	Milena Milojevikj	North Macedonia	59.38	29	20.96	29	38.42
WD	Chiara Hristova	Bulgaria	withdrew	22	37.17	withdrew from competition	
