= Naoki Rossi =

Swiss figure skater

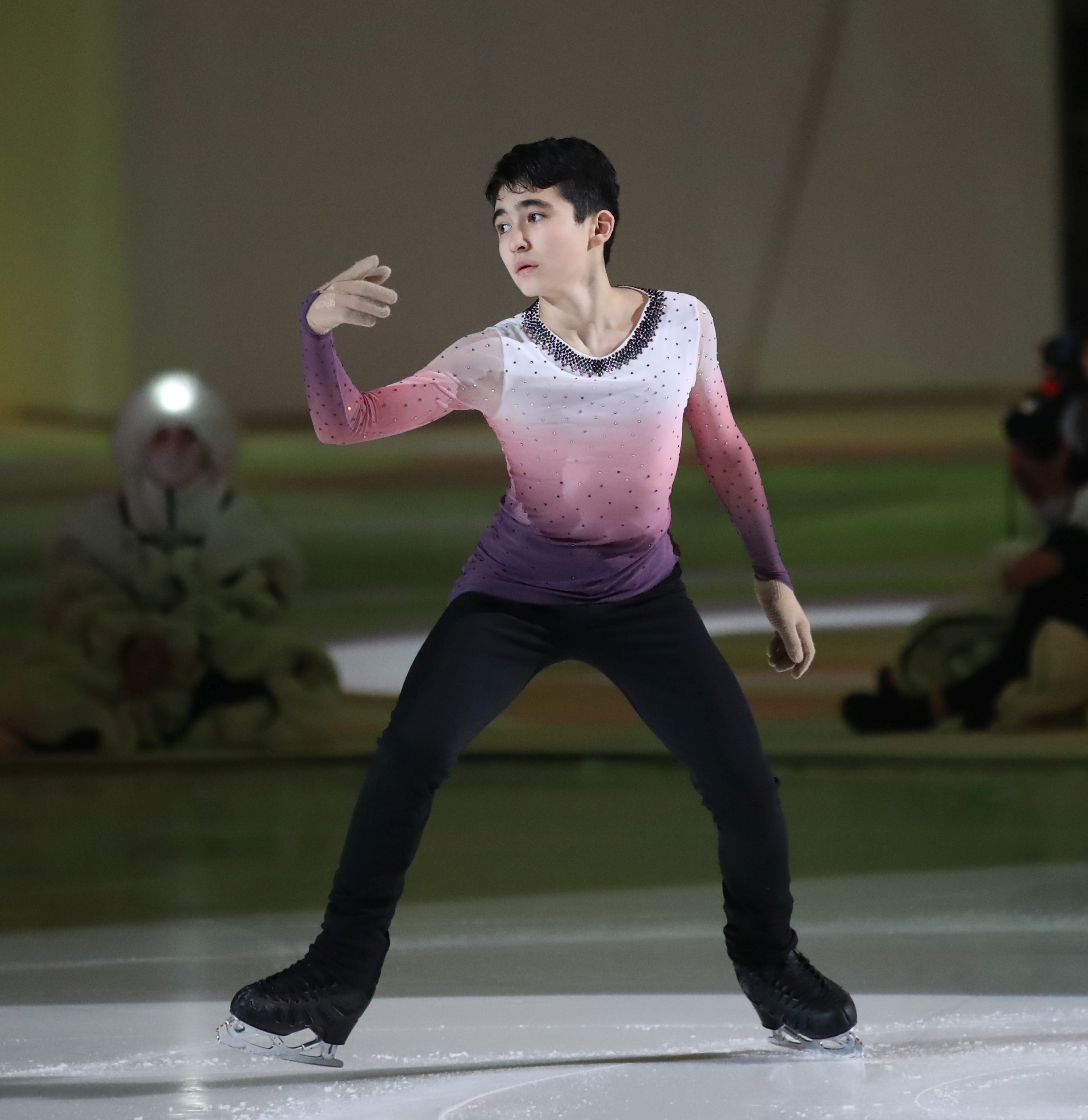
- Naoki Rossi during the Opening Ceremony at the 2020 Winter Youth Olympics

Personal information
- Born: 20 January 2007 (age 19) Zollikerberg, Switzerland
- Home town: Zumikon, Switzerland
- Height: 1.70 m (5 ft 7 in)

Figure skating career
- Country: Switzerland
- Coach: Chafik Besseghier
- Skating club: Club des Patineurs de Champéry
Medal record
Figure skating: Men's singles
Representing Switzerland
World Junior Championships
Silver medal – second place	2023 Calgary	Men's singles
European Youth Olympic Winter Festival
Bronze medal – third place	2023 Friuli-Venezia Giulia	Men's singles

Naoki Rossi (born 20 January 2007) is a Swiss figure skater. He is the 2023 World Junior silver medalist and 2023 JGP Hungary silver medalist.

== Personal life ==
Rossi was born in Zollikerberg, Switzerland. Born to a Japanese mother and Italian-Swiss father, he speaks Japanese, German, English, French, and Italian. Formerly an avid violinist, he started playing the violin before becoming interested in skating, but stopped after moving to Italy.

He is a distant relative of Crown Princess Kiko through his mother, Rieko, who is a second cousin of the princess. Additionally, Rossi's great-great grandfather was Shirō Ikegami, who served as mayor of Osaka from 1913 to 1927, founded Tennōji Zoo in 1915, and opened Japan's first public daycare center in 1919.

In addition to teaching piano, Rossi's mother also teaches ballet with one of her former students being World champion Swiss figure skater, Stéphane Lambiel.

Rossi has cited Yuzuru Hanyu as his biggest figure skating inspiration.

== Career ==
=== Early years ===
When Rossi was five years old, his mother brought him to a nearby ice rink to channel his energy, and he soon decided to continue skating. He competed in the advanced novice category during the 2018–19 and 2019–20 seasons.

In the 2020–21 season, at the age of thirteen, he relocated from Switzerland to Italy, deciding to train at the Young Goose Academy in Egna. His first junior international event was the NRW Trophy in November 2020.

=== 2021–22 season ===
Rossi's ISU Junior Grand Prix (JGP) debut came in September 2021; he placed eighth in Košice, Slovakia, and then fourth in Gdańsk, Poland. He subsequently appeared at a number of other minor international events, and won the Swiss national junior title for the first time.

Ranked twelfth in the short progran and seventh in the free skate, Rossi finished ninth overall at the 2022 World Junior Championships in Tallinn, Estonia.

=== 2022–23 season ===
Again given two Junior Grand Prix assignments, Rossi finished eighth at the 2022 JGP Poland and fourth at the 2022 JGP Italy. He then made his international senior debut on the Challenger circuit, coming seventh at both the 2022 CS Ice Challenge and the 2022 CS Warsaw Cup.

In the new year, Rossi competed at the European Youth Olympic Winter Festival and won the bronze medal. He then won another bronze medal at the senior level at the Tallink Hotels Cup. Assigned to finish his season at the 2023 World Junior Championships in Calgary, Rossi finished third in the short program with a new personal best score of 79.46, winning a bronze small medal. He was third in the free skate as well, but finished second overall and won the silver medal. This was the first Junior World medal for a Swiss skater since Sarah Meier's bronze medal in 2000, the first for a Swiss man since Richard Furrer also won bronze in 1977, and the highest colour of medal for any Swiss skater ever at the championships. Rossi said he was "actually speechless. I never expected to be on the podium."

Following the season, Rossi made a coaching change from Eva Martinek, Lorenzo Magri, Angelina Turenko, and Alisa Mikonsaari to Uwe Kagelmann and Nicole Bettega. He ultimately changed his training base from Egna, Italy to Feldkirch, Vorarlberg, Austria.

=== 2023–24 and 2024–25 season: Health struggles ===
After a disappointing fifth-place finish at the 2023 JGP Austria, Rossi achieved a better result at his second Junior Grand Prix assignment, the 2023 JGP Hungary. Third in the short program, he moved up to second place after the free skate to win the silver medal. Rossi missed the rest of the season due to illness.

In September 2024, it was announced that Rossi had switched coaches from Uwe Kagelmann and Nicole Bettega to Chafik Besseghier. He subsequently missed the 2024–25 figure skating season as well.

In June 2025, Rossi announced his intention to return to competitive figure skating the following season and launched a GoFundMe page to help pay for his training.

== Programs ==
Season	Short program	Free skating	Exhibition gala
2024–2025	El Tango de Roxanne (from Moulin Rouge!) performed by José Feliciano, Ewan McGregor, & Jacek Koman choreo. by Alisa Besseghier	Iron by Woodkid choreo. by Cornelia Leroy	
2023–2024	Bitter and Sweet; Road Signs Variation Exit Run 44; Road Signs Variation One Way by Ezio Bosso choreo. by Stéphane Lambiel	Concerto for Viola d'amore in D Minor, RV 394: Il. Largo by Antonio Vivaldi; The Belt of Faith (from Parasite) by Jung Jae-il choreo. by Stéphane Lambiel	
2022–2023	El Flamenco; Red Violin by Ikuko Kawai choreo. by Stéphane Lambiel	Born from Ashes; True Love's Last Kiss; Yearning Hearts by Eternal Eclipse choreo. by Drew Meekins	You Raise Me Up by Rolf Løvland performed by The O'Neill Brothers, Harrison Craig, Touch of Glass choreo. by Benoît Richaud, Barbara Riboldi
2021–2022	Rain, In Your Black Eyes by Ezio Bosso choreo. by Benoît Richaud, Barbara Riboldi	You Raise Me Up by Rolf Løvland performed by The O'Neill Brothers, Harrison Craig, Touch of Glass choreo. by Benoît Richaud, Barbara Riboldi	
2020–2021	Rain, In Your Black Eyes by Ezio Bosso choreo. by Benoît Richaud, Barbara Riboldi	Main Title Theme (from Rome) by Jeff Beal; Wrench and Numbers (from Fargo season 1) by Jeff Russo; Movement IV (from Flesh and Bone) by Adam Crystal choreo. by Benoît Richaud, Barbara Riboldi	

== Competitive highlights ==
GP: Grand Prix; CS: Challenger Series; JGP: Junior Grand Prix

International
Event	20–21	21–22	22–23	23–24
CS Ice Challenge			7th	
CS Warsaw Cup			7th	WD
Swiss Open				WD
Tallink Hotels Cup			3rd	
International: Junior
Junior Worlds		9th	2nd	
JGP Austria				5th
JGP Hungary				2nd
JGP Italy			4th	
JGP Poland		4th	8th	
JGP Slovakia		8th		
EYOF			3rd	
Challenge Cup		2nd		
Egna Trophy	2nd	2nd		
Ice Challenge		1st		
Merano Ice Trophy		1st		
NRW Trophy	6th			
National
Switzerland		1st J		

== Detailed results ==
=== Junior results ===
2023–24 season
Date	Event	Level	SP	FS	Total
September 20–23, 2023	2023 JGP Hungary	Junior	3; 67.10	2; 137.69	2; 204.79
August 30–September 2, 2023	2023 JGP Austria	Junior	9; 61.78	4; 136.82	5; 198.60
2022–23 season
Date	Event	Level	SP	FS	Total
Feb. 27 – Mar. 5, 2023	2023 World Junior Championships	Junior	3; 79.46	3; 141.22	2; 220.68
February 16–19, 2023	2023 Tallink Hotels Cup	Senior	4; 73.90	2; 145.55	3; 219.45
January 25–27, 2023	2023 European Youth Olympic Festival	Junior	2; 68.88	4; 116.63	3; 185.51
November 17–20, 2022	2022 CS Warsaw Cup	Senior	6; 75.46	8; 132.88	7; 208.34
November 9–13, 2022	2022 CS Ice Challenge	Senior	6; 69.02	11; 128.57	7; 197.59
October 12–15, 2022	2022 JGP Italy	Junior	4; 71.71	6; 126.92	4; 198.63
Sept. 28 – Oct. 1, 2022	2022 JGP Poland I	Junior	6; 66.50	8; 121.35	8; 187.85
2021–22 season
Date	Event	Level	SP	FS	Total
April 13–17, 2022	2022 World Junior Championships	Junior	12; 67.61	7; 139.04	9; 206.65
April 4–7, 2022	2022 Egna Spring Trophy	Junior	2; 68.44	2; 143.02	2; 211.46
February 24–27, 2022	2022 International Challenge Cup	Junior	2; 70.55	1; 139.81	2; 210.36
February 5–6, 2022	2022 Merano Cup	Junior	1; 69.56	1; 134.81	1; 204.37
January 22–23, 2022	2021–22 Swiss Junior Championships	Junior	1; 69.93	1; 139.00	1; 208.93
November 10–14, 2021	2021 Ice Challenge	Junior	2; 62.53	1; 118.29	1; 180.82
Sept. 29 – Oct. 2, 2021	2021 JGP Poland	Junior	7; 65.51	12; 105.60	8; 171.11
September 1–4, 2021	2021 JGP Slovakia	Junior	7; 55.82	4; 122.83	6; 178.65
2020–21 season
Date	Event	Level	SP	FS	Total
April 29 – May 2, 2021	2021 Egna Spring Trophy	Junior	3; 62.62	1; 116.45	2; 179.07
November 26–29, 2020	2020 NRW Trophy	Junior	3; 54.62	8; 83.22	6; 137.84
