= Cayden Dawson =

Canadian ice dancer (born 2006)

Personal information
- Full name: Cayden Oliver Dawson
- Born: 22 February 2006 (age 20) East York, Toronto, Canada
- Home town: Oakville, Ontario
- Height: 1.83 m (6 ft 0 in)

Figure skating career
- Country: Canada (since 2024); Brazil (2021–24)
- Partner: Charlie Anderson (since 2024); Catharina Guedes Tibau (2021–24)
- Coach: Scott Moir; Cara Moir; Sheri Moir; Madison Hubbell; Adrián Díaz; Justin Trojek
- Skating club: Ice Academy of Montreal - Ontario Campus
- Began skating: 2012

Cayden Dawson (born 22 February 2006) is a Canadian ice dancer. With partner, Charlie Anderson, they represented their country in two Junior Grand Prix events in 2025, winning the silver medal at both the 2025 JGP Turkey and the 2025 JGP Thailand.

Together with his previous skating partner, Catharina Guedes Tibau, they were the first Brazilian team to ever qualify for an ISU championship, after getting their minimum technical scores for an ISU Junior World Championships entry.

== Career ==
=== Early career ===
Dawson started skating in 2012. He competed in singles skating until 2020.

=== Ice dancing with Catharina Guedes Tibau for Brazil ===
==== 2021–22 season ====
Dawson switched to ice dance, teaming up with Catharina Guedes Tibau in 2021. He agreed to represent Brazil, Guedes Tibau's birthplace. The COVID-19 pandemic prevented them from officially competing, making the upcoming team wait until the next season to gain international experience.

==== 2022–23 season: Junior Grand Prix debut ====
Guedes Tibau/Dawson announced their partnership publicly on their Instagram account in July. In the same month, they were invited to skate in the exhibition gala of the 2022 Brazilian Championships. In August, Tibau/Dawson competed domestically in Canada representing their skating club in the qualifiers for the Ontario Sectionals, where they finished in fifth place.

Coached by Marc-André Servant, Carol Lane, Jon Lane, and Juris Razgulajevs, the team made their Junior Grand Prix debut at the event in Riga, Latvia. They broke the national score in the discipline, which was previously held by Karolina Calhoun and Michael Valdez, finishing the competition in eleventh place. The duo ended their first participation in the series with the twentieth place at the 2022 JGP Italy in October.

Guedes Tibau/Dawson took another chance in achieving the minimum TES for the Rhythm Dance needed in order to compete at the 2023 Junior Worlds at the 2022 Open D'Andorra, without succeeding. This competition finished the season for them and the team started to work on the next season's programs shortly after.

==== 2023–24 season ====
Guedes Tibau/Dawson started their season at the 2023 Lake Placid International, with a tenth-place finish in both segments and in the total score. They were assigned two Junior Grand Prix spots, at Linz and Osaka.

At the 2023 JGP Cup of Austria, they first achieved the rhythm dance minimum technical element score required for a 2024 Junior World Championships spot, making it the first time ever for Brazil to have an ice dance team qualified for an ISU championship. After not qualifying for the free skating round at the 2024 ISU World Junior Championships, they announced the end of their partnership on March 22, 2024.

=== Ice dancing with Charlie Anderson for Canada ===
==== 2024–25 season ====
Prior to the season, Dawson teamed up with fellow Canadian ice dance, Charlie Anderson, and relocated to London, Ontario to train under Scott Moir, Cara Moir, Sheri Moir, Madison Hubbell, Adrián Díaz, and Justin Trojek. It was subsequently announced that Anderson/Dawson would represent Canada.

Making their national debut, the pair finished eighth at the 2025 Canadian Junior Championships.

==== 2025–26 season ====
Anderson/Dawson began the season by making their junior international debut on the 2025–26 ISU Junior Grand Prix circuit, winning the silver medal at 2025 JGP Turkey.

== Personal life ==
Dawson was born in Toronto, Canada. He holds dual citizenship of both Canada and the United Kingdom, his parents' homeland.

== Programs ==
=== With Anderson ===
Season	Rhythm dance	Free dance	Exhibition gala
2025–2026	I'm Too Sexy by Right Said Fred; Pretty Fly (For a White Guy) by The Offspring; Ice Ice Baby by Vanilla Ice choreo. by Scott Moir, Sheri Moir	Leave a Light On (Acoustic) by Tom Walker; Leave A Light On (Instrumental) performed by Xander Reign; The Scientist by Coldplay performed by Benny Martin & The Wong Janice choreo. by Cara Moir, Madison Hubbell	

=== With Guedes Tibau ===
Season	Rhythm dance	Free dance	Exhibition gala
2023–2024	Slow Hand; Jump (For My Love) by The Pointer Sisters choreo. by Marc-André Servant, Juris Razgulajevs	Jailhouse Rock by Elvis Presley choreo. by Marc-André Servant, Juris Razgulajevs	
2022–2023	Spanish Waltz by Fermin Spanish Guitar; Tango: Bordoneo y 900 by Juan José Mosalini choreo. by Marc-André Servant, Juris Razgulajevs	(I've Had) The Time of My Life (from Dirty Dancing) by Bill Medley, Jennifer Warnes; These Arms of Mine by Otis Redding; Do You Love Me by The Contours choreo. by Marc-André Servant, Juris Razgulajevs	

== Competitive highlights ==
- JGP – Event of the ISU Junior Grand Prix Series
- TBD – Assigned
- WD – Withdrew from competition

=== Ice dance with Charlie Anderson (for Canada) ===
Competition placements at junior level
Season	2024–25	2025–26
Canadian Championships	8th	3rd
JGP Thailand		2nd
JGP Turkey		2nd
Skate Canada Challenge	9th	2nd

=== Ice dance with Catharina Guedes Tibau (for Brazil) ===
Event	22–23	23–24
World Junior Championships		30th
JGP Austria		14th
JGP Italy	20th	
JGP Japan		11th
JGP Latvia	11th	
Lake Placid Ice Dance		10th
Open d'Andorra	7th	
Santa Claus Cup		8th

== Detailed results ==
ISU personal bests highlighted in bold. Small medals for rhythm and free dances awarded at ISU Championships only.

=== With Charlie Anderson ===
2025–26 season
Date	Event	RD	FD	Total
September 10-13, 2025	2025 JGP Thailand.	2; **60.04**	2; 90.73	2; **150.77**
August 27–30, 2025	2025 JGP Turkey	2; 58.67	2; **91.14**	2; 149.79
July 17–20, 2025	2025 Skate Canada NextGen	2; 51.92	3; 82.55	3; 134.47
2024–25 season
Date	Event	RD	FD	Total
January 14–19, 2025	2025 Canadian Junior Championships	11; 48.77	7; 78.34	8; 127.11

=== With Catharina Guedes Tibau ===
Date	Event	RD	FD	Total
2023–24 season
February 28-March 1, 2024	2024 World Junior Championships	30 39.62	–	30 39.62
December 1–3, 2023	2023 Santa Claus Cup	8 46.27	8 68.61	8 114.88
September 14–16, 2023	2023 JGP Osaka	11 41.10	11 60.37	11 101.47
August 31-September 2, 2023	2023 JGP Austria	13 **42.84**	14 66.10	14 **108.94**
August 1–2, 2023	2023 Lake Placid Ice Dance International	10 37.49	10 63.98	10 101.47
2022–23 season
November 16–20, 2022	2022 Open d'Andorra	7 39.47	7 60.63	7 100.10
October 11–15, 2022	2022 JGP Italy	20 37.82	18 58.98	20 96.80
September 7–10, 2022	2022 JGP Latvia	11 37.99	10 **70.83**	11 108.82
