= South East Asian Open Trophy =

The South East Asian Open Trophy (also known as the SEA Open Trophy) is an annual international figure skating competition. The event is a part of the international competitions held under International Skating Union. Medals may be awarded in men's singles, women's singles, pair skating, and ice dance at the senior, junior, and novice levels.

The first edition was held in Singapore.

== Senior results ==
=== Men's singles ===
Year	Location	Gold	Silver	Bronze	Ref.
2022	Singapore	(Singapore) Pagiel Sng	(New Zealand) Douglas Gerber	(Hong Kong) Adonis Wong	
2024	Pasay, Philippines	(Hong Kong) Lincoln Yuen	No other competitors		

=== Women's singles ===
Year	Location	Gold	Silver	Bronze	Ref.
2022	Singapore	(South Korea) Park Yeon-jeong	(Australia) Vlada Vasiliev	(South Korea) Jung Yean	
2024	Pasay, Philippines	(Philippines) Sofia Frank	(Indonesia) Kelly Supangat	(Philippines) Skye Chua	
