= Catharina Guedes Tibau =

Brazilian ice dancer

Personal information
- Born: August 15, 2006 (age 19) Salvador, Bahia, Brazil
- Height: 165 cm (5 ft 5 in)

Figure skating career
- Country: Brazil
- Discipline: Ice dance
- Coach: Scott Moir, Madison Hubbell, Adrián Díaz
- Skating club: Ice Academy of Montreal, London Campus
- Began skating: 2012

Catharina Guedes Tibau (pronounced [kataɾi'na gɛ'dʒis tʃibaw']; born August 15, 2006) is a Brazilian ice dancer. With her former skating partner, Cayden Dawson, she was part of the first team in the country to ever qualify for an ISU championship, after getting their minimum technical scores for an ISU Junior World Championships entry.

== Personal life ==
Tibau was born to Ricardo Tibau and Mariana Guedes Tibau in Salvador, Bahia, Brazil. When she was four years old, they immigrated to Canada. There, her younger sister, Dominique Guedes Tibau, was born.

== Career ==
=== Early career ===
Catharina Guedes Tibau began skating in 2012. Until the age of 10, she competed only in the singles discipline, however, she then decided to try ice dance in 2016 and teamed up with Nicholas Grozdanovski. They ended their partnership in 2020, when Guedes Tibau also stopped competing in singles, at the pre-novice level.

=== 2021–22 season ===
Guedes Tibau started a new team with Cayden Dawson in 2021, who agreed to compete for Brazil, her home country. The COVID-19 pandemic prevented them from making their international debut at that time, making them wait until the next season to officially represent Brazil.

=== 2022–23 season: Junior Grand Prix debut ===
Guedes Tibau/Dawson announced their partnership publicly on their Instagram account in July. Shortly after, they were invited to skate in the exhibition gala of the 2022 Brazilian Championships. In August, Guedes Tibau/Dawson competed domestically in Canada representing their skating club in the qualifiers for the Ontario Sectionals, where they finished in fifth place.

In early September 2022, the team made their Junior Grand Prix debut at the event in Riga, Latvia.They set a new national record in the Junior Grand Prix series for ice dance, surpassing the previous record held by Karolina Calhoun and Michael Valdez in 2018. They concluded the competition in the eleventh position, achieving the free dance minimum technical element score necessary for a 2023 and 2024 Junior World Championships entry. The team concluded their first participation in the series with a twentieth-place finish at the 2022 JGP Italy in October.

They made another attempt to meet the minimum technical element score required for the Rhythm Dance in order to compete at the 2023 Junior Worlds at the 2022 Open D'Andorra, but were unsuccessful. This competition marked the end of the season for them, and the team began working on their programs for the next season.

=== 2023-24 season: World Junior Championships debut ===
ce finish in both segments and in the total score. They were assigned two Junior Grand Prix spots, at Linz and Osaka.

At the 2023 JGP Cup of Austria, they first achieved the rhythm dance minimum technical element score required for a 2024 ISU World Junior Championships spot.This marked a historic achievement, as it was the first time Brazil had an ice dance team qualified for an ISU championship. At JGP Osaka they finished 11th out of 12 teams. After not qualifying for the free skating round at the 2024 ISU World Junior Championships, they announced the end of their partnership on March 22, 2024. After the split, she changed coaches to the Ice Academy of Montreal, London Campus.

== Programs ==
=== With Dawson ===
Season	Rhythm dance	Free dance	Exhibition gala
2023–2024	Slow Hand; Jump (For My Love) by The Pointer Sisters choreo. by Marc-André Servant, Juris Razgulajevs	Are You Lonesome Tonight?; Heartbreak Hotel; Jailhouse Rock by Elvis Presley choreo. by Marc-André Servant, Juris Razgulajevs	
2022–2023	Spanish Waltz by Fermin Spanish Guitar; Tango: Bordoneo y 900 by Juan José Mosalini choreo. by Marc-André Servant, Juris Razgulajevs	(I've Had) The Time of My Life (from Dirty Dancing) by Bill Medley, Jennifer Warnes; These Arms of Mine by Otis Redding; Do You Love Me by The Contours choreo. by Marc-André Servant, Juris Razgulajevs	

== Competitive highlights ==
=== With Dawson for Brazil ===
JGP: Junior Grand Prix

International: Junior
Event	22–23	23–24
Junior Worlds		30th
JGP Austria		14th
JGP Italy	20th	
JGP Japan		11th
JGP Latvia	11th	
Lake Placid I.D.I		10th
Open d'Andorra	7th	
Santa Claus Cup		8th
National
Ontario Sectionals	5th J	5th J
J = Junior level

=== With Grozdanovski for Canada ===
National
Event	18–19	19–20
Skate Canada Challenge	14th P	3rd P
P = Pre-Novice level

== Detailed results ==
=== With Cayden Dawson ===
Date	Event	RD	FD	Total
2023-24 season
February 28-March 1, 2023	2024 World Junior Championships	30 39.62	FNR -	30 39.62
December 1–03, 2023	17th Santa Claus Cup	8 46.27	8 68.61	8 114.88
September 14–16, 2023	JGP Osaka 2023	11 41.10	11 60.37	11 101.47
August 31-September 2, 2023	JGP Cup of Austria 2023	13 **42.84**	14 66.10	14 **108.94**
August 1–2, 2023	2023 Lake Placid Ice Dance International	10 37.49	10 63.98	10 101.47
July 20–22, 2023	2023 Skate Ontario Sectional Series - July	7 42.62	4 72.41	5 115.03
2022-23 season
November 16–20, 2022	Open D'Andorra 2022	7 39.47	7 60.63	7 100.10
October 11–15, 2022	JGP Egna Neukmart 2022	20 37.82	18 58.98	20 96.80
September 7–10, 2022	JGP Riga Cup 2022	11 37.99	10 **70.83**	11 108.82
August 19–21, 2022	2022 Skate Ontario Sectional Series - August	5 46.09	5 65.00	5 111.09

ISU personal bests highlighted in bold. Small medals for rhythm and free dances awarded at ISU Championships only.

FNR = Final not reached
