= Matias Lindfors =

Finnish footballer (born 1997)

Personal information
- Full name: Matias Antero Lindfors
- Date of birth: 15 February 1997 (age 29)
- Place of birth: Helsinki, Finland
- Height: 1.82 m (6 ft 0 in)
- Position: Midfielder

Youth career
- FC Kontu
- –2013: KäPa
- 2013–2016: IF Brommapojkarna

Senior career*
| Years | Team | Apps | (Gls) |
| 2011–2013 | KäPa | 2 | (0) |
| 2016 | KTP | 24 | (1) |
| 2017 | AC Oulu | 19 | (0) |
| 2018–2024 | KTP | 141 | (4) |
| 2021 | → PeKa (loan) | 2 | (0) |
- * Club domestic league appearances and goals as of 6 October 2024

Matias Antero Lindfors (born 15 February 1997) is a Finnish former professional footballer who last played as a midfielder for Ykkösliiga club KTP.

Lindfors announced his retirement from professional playing career at the age of 27, after KTP had secured the Ykkösliiga title and the promotion to Veikkausliiga at the end of the 2024 season due to numerous injuries. However, he continued as a coach for KTP.

== Career statistics ==
As of 6 October 2024.

Appearances and goals by club, season and competition
| Club | Season | League | | | Cup (Note: Includes Suomen Cup) | | League cup (Note: Includes Ykköscup, Finnish League Cup and Ykkösliigacup) | | Europe | | Total | |
| Club | Season | Division | Apps | Goals | Apps | Goals | Apps | Goals | Apps | Goals | Apps | Goals |
|---|---|---|---|---|---|---|---|---|---|---|---|---|
| KäPa | 2011 | Kakkonen | 1 | 0 | – | | – | | – | | 1 | 0 |
| KäPa | 2013 | Kakkonen | 1 | 0 | – | | – | | – | | 1 | 0 |
| KäPa | Total | | 2 | 0 | 0 | 0 | 0 | 0 | 0 | 0 | 2 | 0 |
| KTP | 2016 | Ykkönen | 24 | 1 | 1 | 0 | – | | – | | 25 | 1 |
| AC Oulu | 2017 | Ykkönen | 19 | 0 | 4 | 0 | – | | – | | 23 | 0 |
| KTP | 2018 | Ykkönen | 19 | 0 | 4 | 0 | – | | – | | 23 | 0 |
| KTP | 2019 | Ykkönen | 23 | 2 | 2 | 0 | – | | – | | 25 | 2 |
| KTP | 2020 | Ykkönen | 19 | 0 | 5 | 0 | – | | – | | 24 | 0 |
| KTP | 2021 | Veikkausliiga | 17 | 1 | 2 | 0 | – | | – | | 19 | 1 |
| KTP | 2022 | Ykkönen | 16 | 0 | 1 | 0 | 4 | 0 | – | | 21 | 0 |
| KTP | 2023 | Veikkausliiga | 24 | 0 | 3 | 1 | 3 | 0 | – | | 30 | 1 |
| KTP | 2024 | Ykkösliiga | 23 | 1 | 1 | 0 | 1 | 0 | – | | 25 | 1 |
| KTP | Total | | 141 | 4 | 18 | 1 | 8 | 0 | 0 | 0 | 167 | 5 |
| Peli-Karhut (loan) | 2021 | Kakkonen | 2 | 0 | – | | – | | – | | 2 | 0 |
| Career total | | | 188 | 5 | 23 | 1 | 8 | 0 | 0 | 0 | 219 | 6 |

== Honours ==
KTP

- Ykkösliiga: 2024
- Ykkönen: 2022
- Ykkönen runner-up: 2020
