= Parasite (soundtrack) =

Parasite (Original Motion Picture Soundtrack)
- United States and Canada release cover art

Soundtrack album by Jung Jae-il
- Released: 30 May 2019
- Recorded: 2019
- Genre: Soundtrack
- Length: 52:14
- Language: Korean
- Label: Genie Music; Stone Music Entertainment; Milan Records

Singles from Parasite: Original Motion Picture Soundtrack
- 1. "Soju han jan" Released: 30 May 2019

Parasite (Original Motion Picture Soundtrack) is the soundtrack album to the Academy Award-winning South Korean film Parasite directed by Bong Joon-ho. It was released under the Genie Music and Stone Music Entertainment labels on 30 May 2019, the same day as the film's release and featured musical score composed by Jung Jae-il, who previously collaborated with Bong for Okja (2017).

The score for Parasite consists of "minimalist piano pieces, punctuated with light percussion", which sets the film's "tense atmosphere". Jung provided a baroque texture for the score. The score was mostly composed and recorded in computer. The score received positive critical response, praising Jung as critics opined that "the minimalist approach to the music, blended well with the theme and motive". Jung further won the Buil Film Award and Grand Bell Award for Best Music and further received various accolades.

"Soju han jan" (lit. 'A glass of soju'), (Note: Not to be confused with an unrelated song with same Korean title by Im Chang-jung) a track from the film was released as a single accompanying the album on the same date of its release. The album was released and published in the United States and Canada by Milan Records in October 2019 in digital and a CD release on December. It was further released in vinyl by Sacred Bones Records in February 2020 and was co-released by Waxwork Records with different colour variants.

== Composition ==
During the production of Okja, Bong Joon-ho messaged him about writing another script (which was Parasite) eventually asking him to work on the film, which Jung Jae-il had approved. Jung reflected that, the film needed "a structure that felt continuous yet powerful enough to bring viewers closer to the scene", as a result, he arranged the instruments in such a way to reflect that in the music.

The music had a baroque texture, with eerie and ominous rhythms present in it. Jung stated about the uniqueness in the score, saying "We needed to find a tone that sets the mood for the entire film. We thought of baroque style music and some string instruments. I had already thought of Handel's arias and experimented with the music from different angles. I wanted to emphasize the character's views in a somewhat religious way, but remain elegant yet comical through the music." While watching the film's final edit, Jung elaborated that he thought of different social classes and the sounds unfolded like a staircase, which was not intentional. However, after watching the film, he realised that it had a lot of rise and fall, just like a staircase.

The music sittings involved Jung and Bong discussing about the film's music and where it was meant to go, and later recorded the tracks on computer and letting Joon-ho listen to the final recording. After Bong liked some of the score pieces, the tracks were later orchestrated and recorded, while the pieces which Jung disregarded had been re-written. The score relied on stringed instruments which had its difficulties as "strings are especially difficult to express with computers". The score also features baroque instruments such as harpsichord.

Orchestrations of the score were handled at Budapest Scoring in Hungary. Some other Hungarian companies were also involved in the recording of the score.

== Songs ==
"It's ["The Belt of Faith"] the biggest piece of the score, and has to encompass a lot of scenes; it has to change scene-to-scene to match the emotions. We went over that dozens of times. Around that time, I was afraid Jung Jae-il would never work with me again because he'd suffered so much for this piece of the score."

— Bong Joon-ho, in an interview to Polygon on the composition for "The Belt of Faith".

Jung expressed that composing for "The Belt of Faith" (the film's main theme) was "stressful" and had scored six renditions which were disregarded by Bong, the final version is the seventh version he had mixed for the song. Though the track depicts varied emotions, Bong wanted him to "express just one texture with concentrated sounds". Jung said that though his previous versions of the song being "perfect", it did not meet Bong's expectations. He was despair and drunk, and later that morning, he worked on improvising the meaningless phrases in the song, which ultimately became the final version of the track. Bong, expressed this in an interview to Polygon, and further added Jung may not work with him again due to the difficulties he had while composing the song.

The track "Zappaguri" was a less difficult track, according to Jung, and it was a compressed version of "The Belt of Faith". He re-called that the approach was different as "he wanted it to function in the style of a Tom & Jerry piece", emphasizing each beat of the actions that takes place. The process was much smooth, and Bong liked the tune.

The end credits song "Soju han jan" (Korean: 소주 한 잔, lit. 'A glass of soju') was written by Bong and is performed by Choi Woo-shik, who also played the main character Ki-woo. It is displayed in English as "Soju One Glass" [sic] in the international digital releases of the soundtrack. When the song made it to the December 2019 shortlist for the 92nd Academy Awards in the Best Original Song category, it was listed under a grammatically correct English title, "A Glass of Soju".

Excerpts from Handel's opera Rodelinda and the 1964 Italian song "In ginocchio da te" by Gianni Morandi also appear in the film, although they were not included in the album.

== Track listing ==
The English titles of the scores listed below are as displayed in the back cover of the album and in the international digital releases of the soundtrack; the romanisation of names and nouns used are slightly different from those seen in the official English subtitles as translated by Darcy Paquet.

Original track list
No.	Title	Length
1.	"Opening" (시작, 'Start')	2:07
2.	"Conciliation I" (첫번째 알선, 'First conciliation')	1:04
3.	"On the Way to Rich House" (부잣집 가는 길, 'On the way to the house of a wealthy family')	0:55
4.	"Conciliation II" (두번째 알선, 'Second conciliation')	1:10
5.	"Plum Juice" (매실청, Maesilcheong)	0:55
6.	"Mr. Yoon and Park" (윤기사와 박사장, 'Chauffeur Yoon and President Park')	1:51
7.	"Conciliation III" (세번째 알선, 'Third conciliation')	1:17
8.	"The Belt of Faith" (믿음의 벨트, 'Chain of trust')	7:13
9.	"Moon Gwang Left" (떠나는 문광, 'Moon-gwang leaving')	0:56
10.	"Camping" (야영)	3:05
11.	"The Hellgate" (지옥의 문, 'Gate of Hell')	1:15
12.	"Heartrending Story of Bubu" (부부의 사연, 'Story of a married couple')	1:35
13.	"Zappaguri" (짜파구리, Jjapaguri (Note: Jjapaguri refers to a mashup dish of instant noodles Chapagetti and Neoguri. The name of the dish was translated as "ramdon" in the official English subtitles of the film.))	1:47
14.	"Ghost" (유령)	2:00
15.	"The Family is Busy" (첫번째 동분서주, 'First busyness')	1:09
16.	"Busy to Survive" (두번째 동분서주, 'Second busyness')	1:53
17.	"The Frontal Lobe of Ki Taek" (기택의 전두엽)	2:42
18.	"Water, Ocean" (물바다, 'Flood')	4:41
19.	"Water, Ocean Again" (또 물바다, 'Flood again')	1:36
20.	"It Is Sunday Morning" (일요일 아침, 'Sunday morning')	4:03
21.	"Blood and Sword" (피와 칼, 'Blood and knife')	3:02
22.	"Yasan" (야산, 'Hillock')	1:15
23.	"Moving" (이사)	1:44
24.	"Ending" (끝, 'End')	0:53
25.	"Soju One Glass" (소주 한 잔, 'A glass of soju'; performed by Choi Woo-shik)	3:20
Total length:		52:14

== Release history ==
Parasite (Original Motion Picture Soundtrack) was released in digital and digipak CD formats on 30 May 2019, coinciding with the film's theatrical release. Genie Music and Stone Music Entertainment published the film's soundtrack in South Korea while Milan Records released the soundtrack in US and Canada on 11 October. Following its Academy Award-win, an exclusive vinyl edition of the soundtrack was announced by Sacred Bones Records (a division of Neon). The album was released on double LP format on 14 February 2020, in different colour variants of vinyl—green (green grass), dark green, light green, peach, white-and-gray (Scholar's rock), gold (Oscar gold) and green with red marble. (Note: All vinyl editions are released under the same catalog) Waxwork Records also co-distributed the soundtrack in double vinyl formats. The following are the several editions of the album being released:

Language (Note: Refers to the marketing and packaging in various countries, with the title being changed for local and international release.)	Region	Release date	Format	Labels	Catalog code	Ref.
Korean	Various	30 May 2019	Digital download Streaming	Genie Music; Stone Music Entertainment	—N/a	
Korean	South Korea	30 May 2019	CD	Genie Music; Stone Music Entertainment	—N/a	
English	Various	11 October 2019	Digital download Streaming	Milan Records	—N/a	
English	United States; Canada	20 December 2019	CD	Milan Records	19439750782	
English	United States; Canada	14 February 2020	Vinyl	Sacred Bones Records; Waxwork Records	SBR-247	

== Reception and analysis ==
The score was critically acclaimed. Pitchfork magazine's Vanessa Ague said "With unexpected musical contrasts that evoke a constant sense of uncertainty, composer Jung Jae-il's score hints at what lies beneath the characters' superficial appearances" and gave a score of 7.6 (out of 10). Ague further stated about the comparison of Okja and Parasite as both films depict the inequities of capitalism, but Jung's score for the latter "emphasizes disparate styles". Afterglow's review further analysed that, "Throughout the entire soundtrack, notes of brief joy and long despair help illustrate the emotions experienced when watching the movie's continually twisting plot. While the film already does an impeccable job of telling this story of class struggle, the music challenges the audience to actively engage with the film's deep allegorical meaning" and concluded "the score accentuates the movie's dynamic emotions and underscores its profound messages, transforming Bong Joon-Ho's superb movie into a permanent example of cinematic excellence." Music Press Asia also stated "Juxtaposing the reality of a sinister plot and bold team-Park efforts, Jung echoed the aspiration of Pina Bausch's powerful dance conveyed through music, transcribing the mundane daily lives in Parasite into a genre-bending and satirical plot".

Mark Kermode's "film of the week review" for The Guardian, praised the score for Parasite as "Perfectly accompanying the film's tonal shifts is Jung Jae-il's magnificently modulated music,...". He further wrote "The score moves from the sombre piano patterns of the curtain-raiser, through the mini symphony of The Belt of Faith to the cracked craziness of cues in which choric vocals do battle with a musical saw. Just as the action can segue from slapstick to horror and back – sometimes within the space of a single scene – so Jung plays things straight even as madness beckons, ensuring that the underlying elements of pathos are amplified rather than undercut by pastiche." The Film Scorer further wrote "The jubilant promise Jung's score began with collapses into a dark reality. It becomes a pit in which listener and character alike fall; a nightmare of capitalism."

== Accolades ==
Award	Date of ceremony	Category	Recipient(s)	Result	Ref.
Asian Film Awards	28 October 2020	Best Original Music	Jung Jae-il	Nominated	
Blue Dragon Film Awards	21 November 2019	Best Music	Jung Jae-il	Nominated	
Buil Film Awards	4 October 2019	Best Music	Jung Jae-il	Won	
Georgia Film Critics Association	10 January 2020	Best Original Score	Jung Jae-il	Nominated	
Georgia Film Critics Association	10 January 2020	Best Original Song	"A Glass of Soju" by Jung Jae-il and Bong Joon-ho	Nominated	
Gold Derby Awards	4 February 2020	Best Original Song	“A Glass of Soju” — Jung Jae-il and Bong Joon-ho	Nominated	
Grand Bell Awards	3 June 2020	Best Music	Jung Jae-il	Won	
Hollywood Music in Media Awards	20 November 2019	Best Original Score in a Feature Film	Jung Jae-il	Nominated	
Saturn Awards	26 October 2021	Best Music	Jung Jae-il	Nominated	
