= Emilia Murdock =

American figure skater (born 2002)

Emilia Jane Murdock
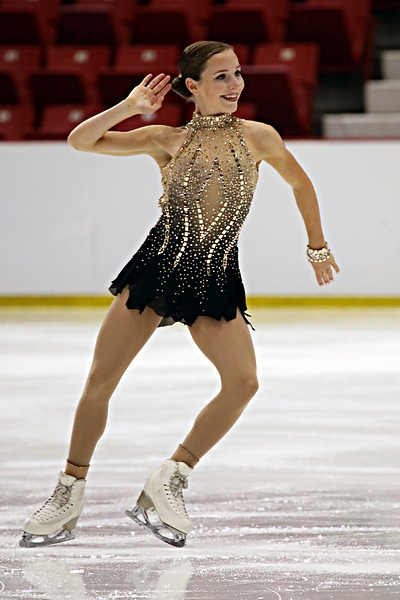
- Emilia Murdock at the 2019 JGP United States

Personal information
- Born: 17 November 2002 (age 23) Greenwich, Connecticut, United States
- Home town: Madrid, Spain

Figure skating career
- Country: Spain (since 2023); United States (2018–23)
- Discipline: Women's singles
- Coach: Tammy Gambill; Damon Allen; Sandy Straub
- Skating club: Valdemoro

Medal record
Spanish Championships
Gold medal – first place	2024 Logroño	Singles

Emilia Jane "Milly" Murdock (born 17 November 2002) is a Spanish-American singles figure skater representing Spain. She represented the United States until the 2023–24 season. She is the 2018 U.S. junior bronze medalist, the 2017 U.S. intermediate silver medalist, the U.S. 2015 juvenile silver medalist, and the 2023 Spanish Championship gold medalist.

== Personal life ==
Emilia "Milly" Murdock was born on November 17, 2002, in Greenwich, Connecticut, in the United States to Sean and Yalin Murdock. Emilia has two brothers, Jack and Patrick. She graduated from The Newman School in Boston, Massachusetts, in 2021. Emilia also runs a blog about healthy eating and nutrition called Bon Athlete.

== Career ==
=== Early career ===
Murdock began skating in 2004, when she was 19 months old. Murdock's mother, Yalin, coached her daughter until the age of 5.

=== For the United States ===
==== 2018–19 season ====
Murdock made her international debut as a junior and won two silver medals at the 2019 Bavarian Open and the 2018 Golden Bear of Zagreb.

==== 2019–20 season ====
Murdock was assigned to the ISU Junior Grand Prix in Lake Placid, New York. She finished 13th in the short program and 7th in the free skate, finishing 7th overall. Her season continued with two domestic competitions finishing 2nd at the Central Pacific Coast Regionals and 3rd at Pacific Coast Sectionals, respectively. Following the conclusion of the season, Murdock left longtime coaches Mark Mitchell and Peter Johansson.

==== 2020–21 season ====
In August 2020, Murdock moved to Toronto to train with Brian Orser and Tracy Wilson. Murdock made her senior debut by qualifying for the U.S. Championships after a sixth-place finish in the virtual U.S. Championship Series. Murdock finished 14th at the 2021 U.S. Championships held in Las Vegas.

==== 2021–22 season ====
In the spring of 2021, Murdock suffered an injury where she had difficulty jumping triple jumps. She finished sixth and ninth place in the Championship Series and did not qualify to compete in January at the 2022 U.S. Championships in Nashville, Tennessee.

==== 2022–23 season ====
In July 2022, Murdock moved to train in Colorado Springs, Colorado, with Tammy Gambill and Damon Allen. Murdock's final competition representing the United States was Midwestern Sectional Singles and U.S. Pairs Final 2023, where she placed 6th in the short, 4th in the free, and 4th overall.

=== For Spain ===
==== 2023–24 season ====
Murdock began representing Spain in 2023, splitting her time between training in Madrid with Laura Fernandez, Javier Fernández's sister, and training in Colorado Springs, Colorado, with coaches Tammy Gambill, Damon Allen, and Sandy Rucker Straub.

Making her international debut representing Spain, Murdock competed at the 2023 Volvo Open Cup and the 2023 NRW Trophy, placing ninth and sixth, respectively. She then attended the 2023 Golden Spin of Zagreb, where she finished in sixteenth place.

After winning the 2023 Spanish Championships, she was named to the team to compete at the 2024 World Championships in Montreal, but failed achieve her technical minimums needed to compete at the event. She ultimately closed the season by winning the silver medal at the 2024 Sofia Trophy.

==== 2024–25 season ====
Murdock began the season by competing on the 2024–25 ISU Challenger Series, finishing eleventh at the 2024 Cranberry Cup International and twenty-first at the 2024 Nebelhorn Trophy. She subsequently finished thirteenth at the 2024 Tayside Trophy and ninth at the 2024 NRW Trophy.

== Programs ==
Season	Short program	Free skating
2024–25	Bad Guy by Billie Eilish choreo. by Jamie Isley	Evita by Andrew Lloyd Webber choreo. by Jamie Isley
2023–24	Cleopatra by Alex North choreo. by Sara Hurtado	This Woman's Work by Kate Bush; Apple of My Eye by Karl Hugo choreo. by David Wilson
2022–23	West Side Story by Leonard Bernstein choreo. by David Wilson	Romeo + Juliet by Craig Armstrong choreo. by David Wilson
2021–22	That Man by Caro Emerald choreo. by Jeffrey Buttle	What the World Needs Now is Love by Stacey Kent choreo. by David Wilson
2020–21	Firework by Katy Perry performed by Karen Olivo choreo. by Jamie Isley	Tangosaín; "Yo Soy Maria" by Luis Bacalov and Hector Ulises Passarella, Myung-whun Chung orchestra choreo. by Jamie Isley
2019–20	Black and Gold by Sam Sparro performed by Brenna Whitaker choreo. by Jamie Isley	Tangosaín; "Yo Soy Maria" by Luis Bacalov and Hector Ulises Passarella, Myung-whun Chung orchestra choreo. by Jamie Isley

== Competitive highlights ==
- JGP – Event of the ISU Junior Grand Prix Series
- CS – Event of the ISU Challenger Series

=== Single skating (for Spain) ===
Competition placements at senior level
Season	2023–24	2024–25
Spanish Championships	1st	
CS Cranberry Cup		11th
CS Nebelhorn Trophy		21st
CS Golden Spin of Zagreb	16th	
NRW Trophy	6th	9th
Road to 26 Trophy		WD
Sofia Trophy	2nd	
Tayside Trophy		13th
Volvo Open Cup	9th	

=== Single skating (for the United States) ===
Competition placements at junior level
Season	2018–19	2019–20	2020–21
U.S. Championships (Senior)			14th
U.S. Championships (Junior)	3rd		
JGP United States		7th	
Bavarian Open	2nd		
Golden Bear of Zagreb	2nd		

== Detailed results ==
=== Single skating (for Spain) ===
ISU personal best scores in the +5/-5 GOE System
Segment	Type	Score	Event
Total	TSS	120.09	2024 CS Cranberry Cup International
Short program	TSS	41.49	2024 CS Nebelhorn Trophy
Short program	TES	19.87	2023 CS Golden Spin of Zagreb
Short program	PCS	22.81	2024 CS Cranberry Cup International
Free skating	TSS	80.01	2024 CS Cranberry Cup International
Free skating	TES	38.36	2024 CS Cranberry Cup International
Free skating	PCS	41.64	2024 CS Cranberry Cup International

Results in the 2023–24 season
Date	Event	SP		FS		Total	
Date	Event	P	Score	P	Score	P	Score
Nov 2–5, 2023	(Latvia) 2023 Volvo Open Cup	8	45.36	9	76.46	9	121.82
Nov 16-19, 2023	(Germany) 2023 NRW Trophy	2	50.29	9	72.66	6	122.95
Dec 6–9, 2023	(Croatia) 2023 CS Golden Spin of Zagreb	17	40.82	16	70.08	16	110.90
Dec 15–17, 2023	(Spain) 2023 Spanish Championships	1	44.89	1	85.42	1	130.31
Jan 13 – Feb 4, 2024	(Bulgaria) 2024 Sofia Trophy	1	43.46	2	81.07	2	124.53

Results in the 2024-25 season
Date	Event	SP		FS		Total	
Date	Event	P	Score	P	Score	P	Score
Aug 8–11, 2024	(United States) 2024 CS Cranberry Cup International	12	40.08	10	80.01	11	120.09
Sep 19–21, 2024	(Germany) 2024 CS Nebelhorn Trophy	19	41.49	21	70.88	21	112.37
Oct 12–13, 2024	(United Kingdom) 2024 Tayside Trophy	11	41.44	14	67.65	13	109.09
Nov 12–17, 2024	(Germany) 2024 NRW Trophy	7	45.13	8	79.74	9	124.87
Feb 18–20, 2025	(Italy) Road to 26 Trophy	12	35.90	—N/a	—N/a	WD	—N/a
