= Camden Pulkinen =

American figure skater (born 2000)

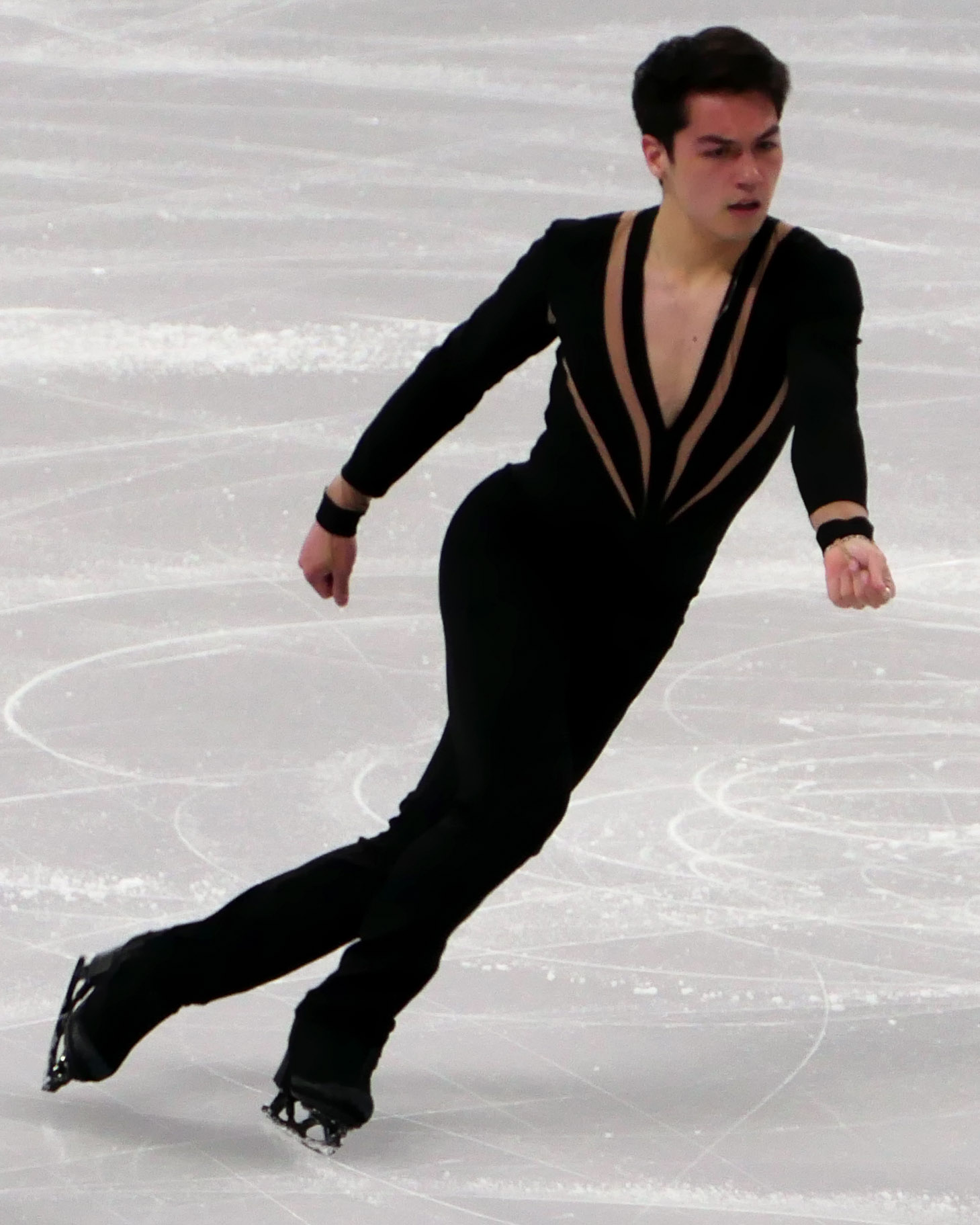
- Pulkinen at the 2024 World Championships

Personal information
- Born: March 25, 2000 (age 26) Scottsdale, Arizona, U.S.
- Home town: New York City, New York, U.S.
- Height: 5 ft 7 in (1.70 m)

Figure skating career
- Country: United States
- Discipline: Men's singles
- Coach: Alex Johnson; Rafael Arutyunyan
- Skating club: Skating Club of New York
- Began skating: 2005
- Highest WS: 20th (2021–22)

Medal record
U.S. Championships
Bronze medal – third place	2024 Columbus	Singles
Bronze medal – third place	2025 Wichita	Singles
Junior Grand Prix Final
Silver medal – second place	2017–18 Nagoya	Singles

Camden Pulkinen (born March 25, 2000) is an American figure skater and he is the 2024, 2025 U.S. bronze medalist. He competed at the 2016 Winter Youth Olympics and is the first male figure skater to compete on behalf of Team USA in the men's singles event at the Winter Youth Olympic Games. He is the 2017–18 Junior Grand Prix Final silver medalist, a two-time JGP Austria champion (2017, 2018), and the 2018 U.S. national junior champion. He finished within the top five at the 2022 World Championships and within the top six at the 2018 World Junior Championships. He is the former world record holder for the junior men's short program. He graduated from Columbia University in May 2024.

== Personal life ==
Pulkinen was born on March 25, 2000, in Scottsdale, Arizona. His older sister, Elena, has also competed in figure skating. Pulkinen's father is of Finnish and French descent, and his mother is from Thailand. He attended Hamilton High School in Chandler, Arizona. Pulkinen attended University of Colorado Colorado Springs part-time for a few years before transferring to Columbia University in August 2022, where he studied psychology and economics.

== Career ==
=== Early career ===
Pulkinen began learning to skate in 2005. He competed on the juvenile level beginning in the 2010–2011 season. He moved up to the intermediate level in 2013–2014 and to the novice ranks the following season.

=== 2015–16 season: Junior international debut ===
Pulkinen moved up to the junior level in the 2015–2016 season. He was coached by Karen Gesell at the Coyotes Skating Club in Scottsdale, Arizona.

After winning the Golden West Championships, he was nominated to represent the United States at the 2016 Winter Youth Olympics in Hamar, Norway. He placed seventh at the competition, held in February 2016.

=== 2016–17 season ===
Pulkinen relocated to Colorado Springs, Colorado in June 2016, where Tom Zakrajsek, Becky Calvin, and Drew Meekins became his coaches.

His ISU Junior Grand Prix (JGP) debut came in October 2016 in Tallinn, Estonia; he finished ninth at the event. In January 2017, he won the junior silver medal at the 2017 U.S. Championships.

=== 2017–18 season: Junior Grand Prix Final silver ===
Making his senior international debut, Pulkinen placed eleventh at the Philadelphia Summer International in early August 2017. He then returned to the junior level, winning gold at a 2017 JGP competition in September in Salzburg, Austria. A month later, he took silver at a JGP event in Gdańsk, Poland, and qualified to the JGP Final in Nagoya, Japan. There, he won the silver medal at the JGP Final. After that, he won gold at the 2018 U.S. Junior Championships. In March, he competed at the 2018 World Junior Championships and placed sixth.

=== 2018–19 season: Senior international debut ===
In early August 2018, Pulkinen placed fourth in the senior ranks at the Philadelphia Summer International. Competing in the 2018–2019 ISU Junior Grand Prix series, he won gold in Linz, Austria. At his second JGP event, he won the silver medal in Ostrava, Czech Republic, setting a world junior record in the short program in the process. His placements in Linz and Ostrava qualified him to the 2018–19 Junior Grand Prix Final in Vancouver, Canada.

Pulkinen next competed at the senior level at the 2018 CS Alpen Trophy, his debut on the Challenger series. He placed fourth in the short, sixth in the free, and sixth overall. At the 2018–19 Junior Grand Prix Final, Pulkinen placed first in the short program, but sixth in the free skate. As a result, he dropped to fifth place overall. Pulkinen commented afterward that he believed he had not trained the free skate sufficiently.

In late January 2019, he finished twelfth at the U.S. Championships, placing eighth in the short program and fifteenth in the free skate. He was nevertheless named to the U.S. team for the 2019 World Junior Championships. He placed first in the short program there, winning a gold small medal, but struggled again in the free skate, where he placed ninth. He finished eighth overall.

In May 2019, Pulkinen announced that he had left coach Tom Zakrajsek to train under Tammy Gambill and Damon Allen.

=== 2019–20 season: Grand Prix debut ===
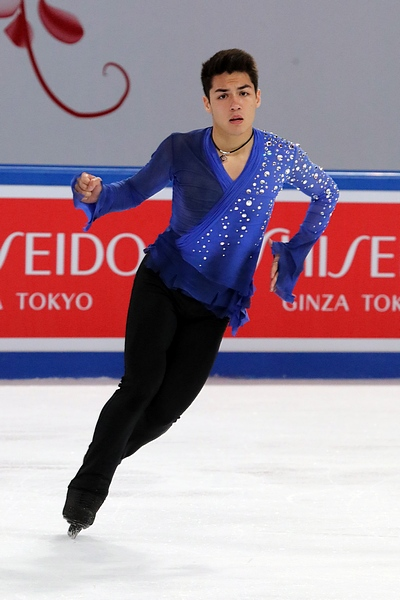
Pulkinen at the 2019 Cup of China

Pulkinen began his first full senior season at the Philadelphia Summer International, where he placed fifth. He also placed fifth at the 2019 CS Autumn Classic International.

Pulkinen made his senior Grand Prix debut at the 2019 Skate Canada International, where he placed second in the short program, landing a ratified quadruple toe loop. He dropped to fourth place following the free skate, while still setting a new personal best in that segment and in total score. Pulkinen had less success at the 2019 Cup of China, where he placed eighth.

Competing at the 2020 U.S. Championships, Pulkinen was seventh in the short program after errors on both his triple Axel and jump combination. Despite some difficult jump landings in the free skate, he remained in seventh overall. Pulkinen was assigned to compete at the 2020 Four Continents Championships in Seoul, South Korea. Pulkinen placed eleventh at Four Continents.

=== 2020–21 season ===
Pulkinen competed in a virtual Peggy Fleming Trophy artistic contest in the summer. With the coronavirus pandemic affecting international travel, assignments for the Grand Prix were made primarily based on training location, resulting in Pulkinen being assigned to the 2020 Skate America. He placed ninth at the event.

Pulkinen placed eighth at the 2021 U.S. Championships. He commented afterward that it had been a "difficult season", but that he was anticipating preparing for the next year.

=== 2021–22 season: World Championships debut ===
Beginning the season at the 2021 U.S. Classic, Pulkinen placed fourth. He withdrew from the 2021 CS Asian Open, instead competing at the 2021 CS Finlandia Trophy, where he finished fourteenth.

At the Grand Prix, Pulkinen placed eleventh at the 2021 NHK Trophy. He was seventh at the 2021 Rostelecom Cup, and said it "definitely could have been better, but I am happy that I could improve from NHK Trophy."

Pulkinen delivered one of the strongest performances of his career at the 2022 U.S. Championships, where he finished fifth. He reflected, "last year was really tough for me, so this whole season was about progressing up to the U.S. Championships, so I’m happy to have done that." He next competed at the 2022 Four Continents Championships, where he finished twelfth.

As second alternate, Pulkinen was called up to compete in his World Championships. He placed twelfth in the short program, third in the free skate, and fifth overall, scoring personal bests in each segment and earning a small bronze medal for the free skate.

=== 2022–23 season ===
Beginning the season on the Challenger series, Pulkinen won the bronze medal at the 2022 CS U.S. Classic, his first international medal at the senior level. He placed fifth at the 2022 Skate Canada International, his first Grand Prix assignment, and fifth as well at the 2022 Grand Prix of Espoo.

He went on to win the gold medal at the 2022 CS Golden Spin of Zagreb.

At the 2023 U.S. Championships, Pulkinen finished eighth and was named as the first alternate for the World Championships.

=== 2023–24 season ===
Pulkinen began the season by finishing fourth at the 2023 CS Lombardia Trophy. On the Grand Prix, he was fifth at both the 2023 Grand Prix de France and 2023 NHK Trophy.

Ahead of the 2024 U.S. Championships, Pulkinen was preemptively named to the US team for the 2024 Four Continents Championships, which were to be held the week after the U.S. Championships in Shanghai. At the U.S. Championships, Pulkinen was fifth after the short program. In the free skate, he skated a clean program, with the only mistake being a triple jump being turned into a single, and he moved up to third to win the bronze medal. “Coming off of a lot of fantastic skating outside of U.S. Championships, I think I kind of struggled a bit in the past with dealing with the pressure," he said after the free skate. This was his first national championship medal at the senior level. He was assigned to compete at the 2024 World Championships and subsequently withdrew from his Four Continents assignment to focus on preparing for the World Championships.

At the 2024 World Championships, Pulkinen came in 20th overall. He expressed disappointment in his performance and said of his programs, "In the short I was a little too high energy. In the long program, a little too low."

=== 2024–25 season ===
Pulkinen began the season with a fourth-place finish at the 2024 Cranberry Cup International. Going on to compete on the 2024–25 Grand Prix circuit, he finished eleventh at the 2024 Grand Prix de France and ninth at the 2024 Finlandia Trophy.

In January, Pulkinen competed at the 2025 U.S. Championships, winning the bronze medal for a second consecutive time. He subsequently competed at the 2025 Four Continents Championships, where he finished in eighth place. “I think standing on the podium for the second time is super validating," he said.

On March 2, 2025, Pulkinen took part in Legacy on Ice, an ice show organized by U.S. Figure Skating that paid tribute to lives lost aboard the American Eagle Flight 5342.

=== 2025–26 season ===
During the off-season, Pulkinen sustained a back injury, forcing him to withdraw from the 2025 CS Nepela Memorial and the 2025 Cup of China. In December, he announced his withdrawal from the 2026 U.S. Championships due to his ongoing injury.

== Programs ==
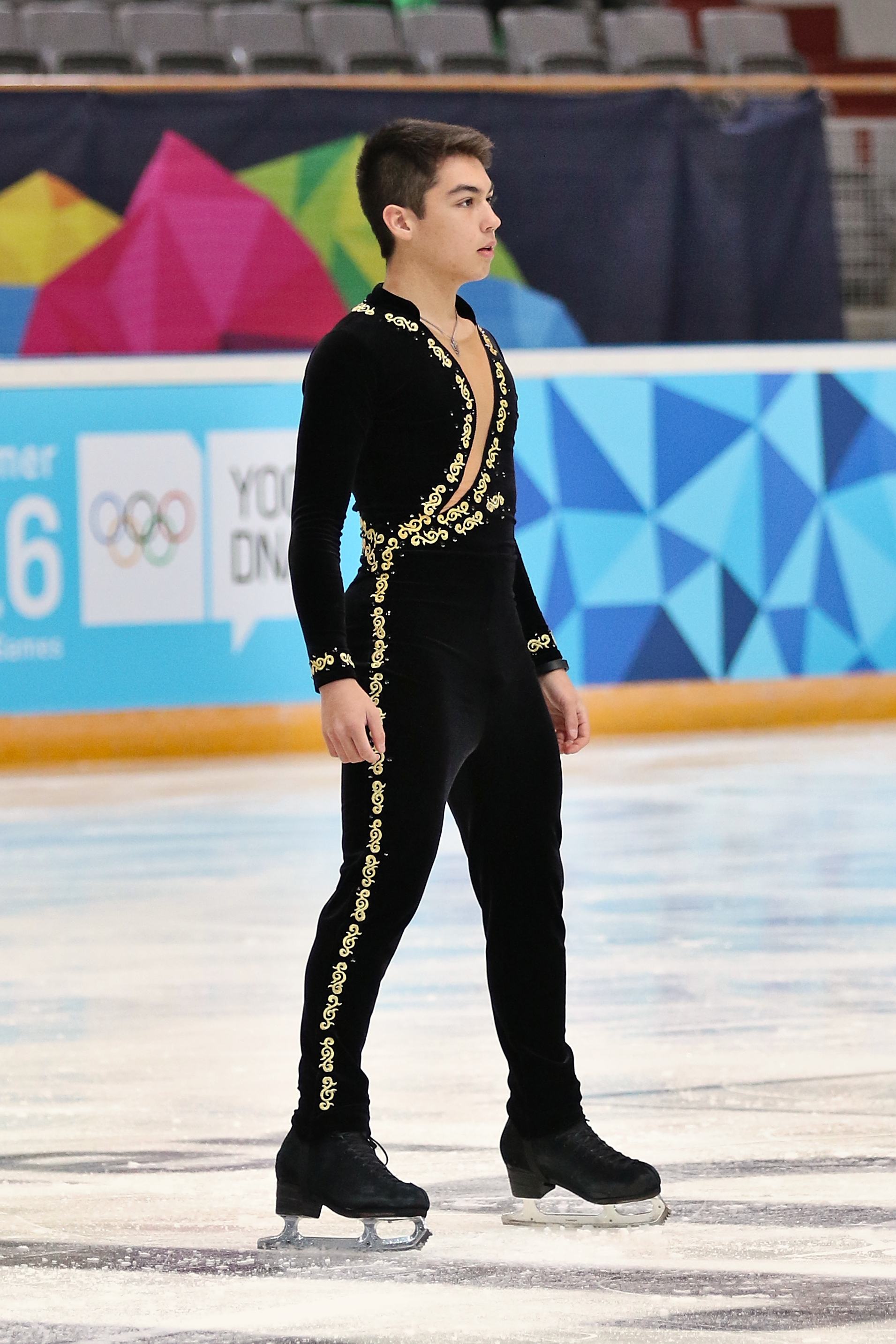
Pulkinen at the 2016 Winter Youth Olympics

Season	Short program	Free skating	Exhibition
2015–16	Paganini Rhapsody (on Caprice 24); Caprice No. 24 for Violin Op. 1 by Niccolò Paganini both performed by David Garrett	The Lone Ranger by Hans Zimmer	
2016–17	Piano Concerto No 1 in F Sharp Minor Op 1 Vivace by Fritz Reiner, Byron Janis; Concerto No 2 for Piano and Orchestra, Op 18 in C Minor Moderato by Arthur Rubinstein	Sarabande Suite (Aeternae) by Globus	
2017–18	Fix You by Coldplay choreo. by Drew Meekins	Étude Op. 10, No. 12 by Frédéric Chopin choreo. by Tom Dickson	
2018–19	Oblivion by Astor Piazzolla performed by Lucia Micarelli choreo. by Stéphane Lambiel	West Side Story by Leonard Bernstein choreo. by Tom Dickson	
2019–20	Caruso by Lucio Dalla performed by Josh Groban choreo. by Joshua Farris	The Last Emperor by Ryuichi Sakamoto choreo. by Stéphane Lambiel	
2020–21	Caruso by Lucio Dalla performed by Josh Groban choreo. by Joshua Farris; In This Shirt by The Irrepressibles choreo. by Joshua Farris	Close Your Eyes by Rhodes choreo. by Joshua Farris, Stéphane Lambiel	
2021–22	Come What May (from Moulin Rouge!) performed by Ewan McGregor & Nicole Kidman choreo. by Tom Dickson, Pasquale Camerlengo	Bésame Mucho by Consuelo Velázquez performed by Il Divo choreo. by Tom Dickson, Pasquale Camerlengo	
2022–23	Fly Me to the Moon performed by Chris Mann choreo. by Shae-Lynn Bourne, Stéphane Lambiel, Alex Johnson	Invierno Porteño by Astor Piazzolla choreo. by Shae-Lynn Bourne, Stéphane Lambiel, Alex Johnson	Human by Rag'n'Bone Man
2023–24	A Different Kind of Love by Son Lux choreo. by Marie-France Dubreuil	E lucevan le stelle (from Tosca); Quando me'n vo' (from La bohème) by Giacomo Puccini choreo. by Shae-Lynn Bourne	La Samba by Wax Motif & Riordan
2024–25	Break My Heart Again by Finneas choreo. by David Wilson; Come What May (from Moulin Rouge!) performed by Ewan McGregor & Nicole Kidman choreo. by Tom Dickson, Pasquale Camerlengo	Outro; Solitude by M83 choreo. by Shae-Lynn Bourne	On the Nature of Daylight; November by Max Richter

== Competitive highlights ==
- GP – Event of the ISU Grand Prix Series
- JGP – Event of the ISU Junior Grand Prix Series
- CS – Event of the ISU Challenger Series
- TBD – Assigned
- WD – Withdrew from competition

Competition placements at senior level
Season	2017–18	2018–19	2019–20	2020–21	2021–22	2022–23	2023–24	2024–25
World Championships					5th		20th	
Four Continents Championships			11th		12th			8th
U.S. Championships		12th	7th	8th	5th	8th	3rd	3rd
GP Cup of China			8th					
GP Finland						5th		9th
GP France							5th	11th
GP NHK Trophy					11th		5th	
GP Rostelecom Cup					7th			
GP Skate America				9th				
GP Skate Canada			4th			5th		
CS Alpen Trophy		6th						
CS Autumn Classic			5th					
CS Cranberry Cup					8th			4th
CS Finlandia Trophy					14th			
CS Golden Spin of Zagreb			6th			1st		
CS Lombardia Trophy							4th	
CS U.S. Classic					4th	3rd		
Philadelphia Summer	11th	4th	5th					

Competition placements at junior level
Season	2015–16	2016–17	2017–18	2018–19
Winter Youth Olympics	7th			
World Junior Championships			6th	8th
Junior Grand Prix Final			2nd	5th
U.S. Championships	11th	2nd	1st	
JGP Austria			1st	1st
JGP Czech Republic				2nd
JGP Estonia		9th		
JGP Poland			2nd	

== Detailed results ==
ISU personal best scores in the +5/-5 GOE System
Segment	Type	Score	Event
Total	TSS	271.69	2022 World Championships
Short program	TSS	89.50	2022 World Championships
Short program	TES	48.63	2022 World Championships
Short program	PCS	41.14	2019 Skate Canada International
Free skating	TSS	182.19	2022 World Championships
Free skating	TES	97.61	2022 World Championships
Free skating	PCS	84.58	2022 World Championships

ISU personal best scores in the +3/-3 GOE System
Segment	Type	Score	Event
Total	TSS	217.10	2017−18 Junior Grand Prix Final
Short program	TSS	70.90	2017−18 Junior Grand Prix Final
Short program	TES	36.23	2017 JGP Poland
Short program	PCS	35.33	2017−18 Junior Grand Prix Final
Free skating	TSS	146.20	2017−18 Junior Grand Prix Final
Free skating	TES	75.48	2017−18 Junior Grand Prix Final
Free skating	PCS	70.72	2017−18 Junior Grand Prix Final

=== Senior level ===
Results in the 2017–18 season
Date	Event	SP		FS		Total	
Date	Event	P	Score	P	Score	P	Score
Aug 3–5, 2017	(United States) 2017 Philadelphia Summer International	11	56.57	11	113.02	11	169.59

Results in the 2018–19 season
Date	Event	SP		FS		Total	
Date	Event	P	Score	P	Score	P	Score
Aug 3–5, 2018	(United States) 2018 Philadelphia Summer International	5	67.20	4	127.82	4	195.02
Nov 11–18, 2018	(Austria) 2018 CS Alpen Trophy	6	83.44	7	147.40	5	230.84
Jan 19–27, 2019	(United States) 2019 U.S. Championships	8	78.39	15	121.48	12	199.87

Results in the 2019–20 season
Date	Event	SP		FS		Total	
Date	Event	P	Score	P	Score	P	Score
Jul 31 – Aug 3, 2019	(United States) 2019 Philadelphia Summer International	6	57.81	2	128.61	5	186.42
Sep 12–14, 2019	(Canada) 2019 CS Autumn Classic International	5	81.34	6	138.34	5	216.25
Oct 25–27, 2019	2019 Skate Canada International	2	89.05	4	155.73	4	244.78
Nov 8–10, 2019	2019 Cup of China	4	78.92	9	139.75	8	218.67
Dec 4–7, 2019	(Croatia) 2019 CS Golden Spin of Zagreb	5	76.04	7	143.53	6	219.57
Jan 20–26, 2020	(United States) 2020 U.S. Championships	7	79.19	7	156.89	7	236.08
Feb 4–9, 2020	(South Korea) 2020 Four Continents Championships	10	84.66	11	142.16	11	226.82

Results in the 2020–21 season
Date	Event	SP		FS		Total	
Date	Event	P	Score	P	Score	P	Score
Oct 23–24, 2020	(United States) 2020 Skate America	9	69.09	7	138.73	9	207.82
Jan 11–21, 2021	(United States) 2021 U.S. Championships	7	80.08	9	140.02	8	220.10

Results in the 2021–22 season
Date	Event	SP		FS		Total	
Date	Event	P	Score	P	Score	P	Score
Aug 11–15, 2021	(United States) 2021 Cranberry Cup International	10	61.13	8	118.37	8	179.50
Sep 14–17, 2021	(United States) 2021 U.S. International Classic	6	66.84	4	142.15	4	208.99
Oct 7–10, 2021	(Finland) 2021 CS Finlandia Trophy	6	75.51	15	128.73	14	204.24
Nov 12–14, 2021	(Japan) 2021 NHK Trophy	11	55.53	11	137.65	11	193.18
Nov 26–28, 2021	(Russia) 2021 Rostelecom Cup	5	83.47	9	154.50	7	237.97
Jan 3–9, 2022	(United States) 2022 U.S. Championships	6	90.16	5	170.25	5	260.41
Jan 18–23, 2022	(Estonia) 2022 Four Continents Championships	14	57.58	7	146.81	12	204.39
Mar 21–27, 2022	(France) 2022 World Championships	12	89.50	3	182.19	5	271.69

Results in the 2022–23 season
Date	Event	SP		FS		Total	
Date	Event	P	Score	P	Score	P	Score
Sep 13–16, 2022	(United States) 2022 CS U.S. International Classic	3	77.44	4	142.05	3	219.49
Oct 28–30, 2022	2022 Skate Canada International	5	75.07	8	143.99	5	219.06
Nov 25–27, 2022	(Finland) 2022 Grand Prix of Espoo	7	72.45	5	157.47	5	229.92
Dec 7–10, 2022	(Croatia) 2022 CS Golden Spin of Zagreb	1	85.45	2	156.64	1	242.09
Jan 23–29, 2023	(United States) 2023 U.S. Championships	11	69.47	7	154.25	8	223.72

Results in the 2023–24 season
Date	Event	SP		FS		Total	
Date	Event	P	Score	P	Score	P	Score
Sep 8–10, 2023	(Italy) 2023 CS Lombardia Trophy	8	62.96	3	147.50	4	210.46
Nov 3–5, 2023	2023 Grand Prix de France	6	83.44	7	147.40	5	230.84
Nov 24–26, 2023	(Japan) 2023 NHK Trophy	4	86.40	8	142.92	5	229.32
Jan 22–28, 2024	(United States) 2024 U.S. Championships	5	87.90	3	174.43	3	262.33
Mar 18–24, 2024	(Canada) 2024 World Championships	17	78.85	20	141.01	20	219.86

Results in the 2024–25 season
Date	Event	SP		FS		Total	
Date	Event	P	Score	P	Score	P	Score
Aug 8–11, 2024	(United States) 2024 CS Cranberry Cup International	8	77.83	4	149.14	4	226.97
Nov 1–3, 2024	2024 Grand Prix de France	11	64.48	12	129.12	11	193.60
Nov 15–17, 2024	(Finland) 2024 Finlandia Trophy	10	64.34	9	130.84	9	195.18
Jan 20–26, 2025	(United States) 2025 U.S. Championships	4	88.76	4	164.16	3	252.92
Feb 19–23, 2025	(South Korea) 2025 Four Continents Championships	16	65.79	8	151.46	8	217.25

=== Junior level ===
Results in the 2015–16 season
Date	Event	SP		FS		Total	
Date	Event	P	Score	P	Score	P	Score
Jan 15–24, 2016	(United States) 2016 U.S. Championships (Junior)	11	46.80	10	98.59	11	145.39
Feb 12–21, 2016	(Norway) 2016 Winter Youth Olympics	7	57.91	8	108.68	7	166.59

Results in the 2016–17 season
Date	Event	SP		FS		Total	
Date	Event	P	Score	P	Score	P	Score
Sep 28 – Oct 1, 2016	2016 JGP Estonia	9	60.44	9	111.25	9	171.69
Jan 14–22, 2017	(United States) 2017 U.S. Championships (Junior)	1	73.41	2	124.24	2	197.65

Results in the 2017–18 season
Date	Event	SP		FS		Total	
Date	Event	P	Score	P	Score	P	Score
Aug 23–36, 2017	2018 JGP Austria	1	66.34	1	137.46	1	203.80
Oct 4–7, 2017	2018 JGP Poland	4	68.52	1	140.83	2	209.35
Dec 7–10, 2017	(Japan) 2017–18 Junior Grand Prix Final	5	70.90	2	146.20	2	217.10
Dec 29, 2017 – Jan 8, 2018	(United States) 2018 U.S. Championships (Junior)	1	67.88	1	151.41	1	219.29
Mar 5–11, 2018	(Bulgaria) 2018 World Junior Championships	17	62.31	4	145.57	6	207.88

Results in the 2018–19 season
Date	Event	SP		FS		Total	
Date	Event	P	Score	P	Score	P	Score
Aug 29 – Sep 1, 2018	2018 JGP Austria	2	76.15	1	147.80	1	223.95
Sep 26–29, 2018	2018 JGP Czech Republic	1	81.01	5	131.44	2	212.45
Dec 6–9, 2018	(Canada) 2018–19 Junior Grand Prix Final	1	80.31	6	117.37	5	197.68
Mar 4–10, 2019	(Croatia) 2019 World Junior Championships	1	82.41	9	134.27	8	216.68
