= 2024–25 ISU Challenger Series =

Figure skating competition

- Type: ISU Challenger Series
- Date: August 8 – December 7, 2024
- Season: 2024–25
- Previous: 2023–24 ISU Challenger Series
- Next: 2025–26 ISU Challenger Series

The 2024–25 ISU Challenger Series was held from August to December 2024. It was the tenth season of the ISU Challenger Series, a group of senior-level international figure skating competitions.

== Competitions ==
The International Skating Union announced the Challenger Series schedule on March 19, 2024. This season, the series included the following events.

Date	Event	Location	Notes	Ref.
August 8–11	(United States) 2024 Cranberry Cup International	Norwood, Massachusetts, United States	Men's and women's singles only	
September 3–4	(United States) 2024 John Nicks International Pairs Competition	New York City, New York, United States	Pairs only	
September 13–15	(Italy) 2024 Lombardia Trophy	Bergamo, Italy		
September 19–21	(Germany) 2024 Nebelhorn Trophy	Oberstdorf, Germany		
October 3–6	(Kazakhstan) 2024 Denis Ten Memorial Challenge	Astana, Kazakhstan	No pairs	
October 11–13	(Hungary) 2024 Budapest Trophy	Budapest, Hungary	No pairs	
October 16–20	(France) 2024 Trophée Métropole Nice Côte d'Azur	Nice, France	No pairs	
October 24–26	(Slovakia) 2024 Nepela Memorial	Bratislava, Slovakia	No pairs	
November 12–17	(Estonia) 2024 Tallinn Trophy	Tallinn, Estonia	No pairs	
November 20–24	(Poland) 2024 Warsaw Cup	Warsaw, Poland		
December 4–7	(Croatia) 2024 Golden Spin of Zagreb	Zagreb, Croatia		

== Requirements ==
Skaters were eligible to compete in the Challenger Series if they have reached the age of 16 before July 1, 2024.

== Medal summary ==
=== Men's singles ===
Competition	Gold	Silver	Bronze	Ref.
(United States) 2024 Cranberry Cup International	(United States) Lucas Broussard	(France) Luc Economides	(United States) Jimmy Ma	
(Italy) 2024 Lombardia Trophy	(United States) Ilia Malinin	(Japan) Yuma Kagiyama	(Japan) Shun Sato	
(Germany) 2024 Nebelhorn Trophy	(Japan) Sōta Yamamoto	(Italy) Gabriele Frangipani	(Latvia) Deniss Vasiļjevs	
(Kazakhstan) 2024 Denis Ten Memorial Challenge	(Kazakhstan) Mikhail Shaidorov	(Azerbaijan) Vladimir Litvintsev	(Georgia (country)) Nika Egadze	
(Hungary) 2024 Budapest Trophy	(Italy) Matteo Rizzo	(Switzerland) Lukas Britschgi	(Germany) Nikita Starostin	
(France) 2024 Trophée Métropole Nice Côte d'Azur	(France) Adam Siao Him Fa	(Switzerland) Lukas Britschgi	(Estonia) Mihhail Selevko	
(Slovakia) 2024 Nepela Memorial	(Italy) Daniel Grassl	(Italy) Nikolaj Memola	(Italy) Corey Circelli	
(Estonia) 2024 Tallinn Trophy	(United States) Jacob Sanchez	(United States) Daniel Martynov	(Canada) Roman Sadovsky	
(Poland) 2024 Warsaw Cup	(Poland) Vladimir Samoilov	(Italy) Gabriele Frangipani	(Ukraine) Ivan Shmuratko	
(Croatia) 2024 Golden Spin of Zagreb	(Estonia) Mihhail Selevko	(Estonia) Aleksandr Selevko	(France) François Pitot	

=== Women's singles ===
Competition	Gold	Silver	Bronze	Ref.
(United States) 2024 Cranberry Cup International	(United States) Sarah Everhardt	(United States) Elyce Lin-Gracey	(United States) Isabeau Levito	
(Italy) 2024 Lombardia Trophy	(United States) Amber Glenn	(United States) Sarah Everhardt	(Japan) Kaori Sakamoto	
(Germany) 2024 Nebelhorn Trophy	(United States) Elyce Lin-Gracey	(United States) Isabeau Levito	(Japan) Hana Yoshida	
(Kazakhstan) 2024 Denis Ten Memorial Challenge	(Georgia (country)) Anastasiia Gubanova	(Kazakhstan) Sofia Samodelkina	(Italy) Lara Naki Gutmann	
(Hungary) 2024 Budapest Trophy	(United States) Alysa Liu	(Switzerland) Kimmy Repond	(France) Lorine Schild	
(France) 2024 Trophée Métropole Nice Côte d'Azur	(South Korea) Kim Chae-yeon	(Estonia) Niina Petrõkina	(Canada) Fee Ann Landry	
(Slovakia) 2024 Nepela Memorial	(South Korea) Yun Ah-sun	(Israel) Mariia Seniuk	(Italy) Lara Naki Gutmann	
(Estonia) 2024 Tallinn Trophy	(Belgium) Nina Pinzarrone	(Kazakhstan) Sofia Samodelkina	(Canada) Sara-Maude Dupuis	
(Poland) 2024 Warsaw Cup	(Canada) Katherine Medland Spence	(Poland) Ekaterina Kurakova	(Italy) Marina Piredda	
(Croatia) 2024 Golden Spin of Zagreb	(United States) Alysa Liu	(Belgium) Nina Pinzarrone	(United States) Bradie Tennell	

=== Pairs ===
Competition	Gold	Silver	Bronze	Ref.
(United States) 2024 John Nicks International Pairs Competition	(United States); Ellie Kam; Daniel O'Shea	(United States); Alisa Efimova; Misha Mitrofanov	(Uzbekistan); Ekaterina Geynish; Dmitrii Chigirev	
(Italy) 2024 Lombardia Trophy	(Italy); Sara Conti; Niccolo Macii	(Japan); Riku Miura; Ryuichi Kihara	(Hungary); Maria Pavlova; Alexei Sviatchenko	
(Germany) 2024 Nebelhorn Trophy	(Germany); Minerva Fabienne Hase; Nikita Volodin	(Canada); Deanna Stellato-Dudek; Maxime Deschamps	(United States); Ellie Kam; Danny O'Shea	
(Poland) 2024 Warsaw Cup	(Georgia (country)); Anastasiia Metelkina; Luka Berulava	(United Kingdom); Anastasia Vaipan-Law; Luke Digby	(Canada); Fiona Bombardier; Benjamin Mimar	
(Croatia) 2024 Golden Spin of Zagreb	(Poland); Ioulia Chtchetinina; Michał Woźniak	(United States); Emily Chan; Spencer Akira Howe	(United States); Audrey Shin; Balázs Nagy	

=== Ice dance ===
Competition	Gold	Silver	Bronze	Ref.
(Italy) 2024 Lombardia Trophy	(Italy); Charlène Guignard; Marco Fabbri	(United States); Annabelle Morozov; Jeffrey Chen	(United States); Leah Neset; Artem Markelov	
(Germany) 2024 Nebelhorn Trophy	(United Kingdom); Lilah Fear; Lewis Gibson	(United States); Christina Carreira; Anthony Ponomarenko	(United States); Emilea Zingas; Vadym Kolesnik	
(Kazakhstan) 2024 Denis Ten Memorial Challenge	(Czech Republic); Natálie Taschlerová; Filip Taschler	(United States); Oona Brown; Gage Brown	(Canada); Alicia Fabbri; Paul Ayer	
(Hungary) 2024 Budapest Trophy	(United States); Christina Carreira; Anthony Ponomarenko	(United States); Emily Bratti; Ian Somerville	(Finland); Juulia Turkkila; Matthias Versluis	
(France) 2024 Trophée Métropole Nice Côte d'Azur	(Lithuania); Allison Reed; Saulius Ambrulevičius	(United States); Caroline Green; Michael Parsons	(United States); Eva Pate; Logan Bye	
(Slovakia) 2024 Nepela Memorial	(United Kingdom); Lilah Fear; Lewis Gibson	(Georgia (country)); Diana Davis; Gleb Smolkin	(Spain); Olivia Smart; Tim Dieck	
(Estonia) 2024 Tallinn Trophy	(France); Evgeniia Lopareva; Geoffrey Brissaud	(United States); Emily Bratti; Ian Somerville	(Czech Republic); Kateřina Mrázková; Daniel Mrázek	
(Poland) 2024 Warsaw Cup	(France); Evgeniia Lopareva; Geoffrey Brissaud	(United States); Emilea Zingas; Vadym Kolesnik	(South Korea); Hannah Lim; Ye Quan	
(Croatia) 2024 Golden Spin of Zagreb	(United Kingdom); Phebe Bekker; James Hernandez	(Georgia (country)); Diana Davis; Gleb Smolkin	(Germany); Jennifer Janse van Rensburg; Benjamin Steffan	

=== Medal standings ===
Rank	Nation	Gold	Silver	Bronze	Total
1	United States	10	13	8	31
2	Italy	4	3	4	11
3	France	3	1	2	6
4	Great Britain	3	1	0	4
5	Georgia	2	2	1	5
6	Poland	2	1	0	3
7	South Korea	2	0	1	3
8	Japan	1	2	3	6
9	Estonia	1	2	1	4
10	Kazakhstan	1	2	0	3
11	Canada	1	1	5	7
12	Belgium	1	1	0	2
13	Germany	1	0	2	3
14	Czech Republic	1	0	1	2
15	Lithuania	1	0	0	1
16	Switzerland	0	3	0	3
17	Azerbaijan	0	1	0	1
17	Israel	0	1	0	1
19	Finland	0	0	1	1
19	Hungary	0	0	1	1
19	Latvia	0	0	1	1
19	Spain	0	0	1	1
19	Ukraine	0	0	1	1
19	Uzbekistan	0	0	1	1
Totals (24 entries)		34	34	34	102

== Challenger Series rankings ==
The ISU Challenger Series rankings were formed by combining the two highest final scores of each skater or team.

=== Men's singles ===
As of December 10, 2024.

No.	Skater	Nation	First event	Score	Second event	Score	Total score
1	Daniel Grassl	Italy	2024 Denis Ten Memorial Challenge	237.70	2024 Nepela Memorial	267.08	504.78
2	Mihhail Selevko	Estonia	2024 Trophée Métropole Nice Côte d'Azur	232.95	2024 Golden Spin of Zagreb	245.06	478.01
3	Nika Egadze	Georgia	2024 Lombardia Trophy	232.01	2024 Denis Ten Memorial Challenge	242.43	474.44
4	Lukas Britschgi	Switzerland	2024 Budapest Trophy	238.02	2024 Trophée Métropole Nice Côte d'Azur	233.22	471.24
5	Jimmy Ma	United States	2024 Cranberry Cup International	236.77	2024 Lombardia Trophy	229.41	466.18

=== Women's singles ===
As of December 10, 2024.

No.	Skater	Nation	First event	Score	Second event	Score	Total score
1	Elyce Lin-Gracey	United States	2024 Cranberry Cup International	193.99	2024 Nebelhorn Trophy	213.33	407.32
2	Sarah Everhardt	United States	2024 Cranberry Cup International	196.42	2024 Lombardia Trophy	201.90	398.32
3	Isabeau Levito	United States	2024 Cranberry Cup International	193.81	2024 Nebelhorn Trophy	198.13	391.94
4	Anastasiia Gubanova	Georgia	2024 Lombardia Trophy	195.74	2024 Denis Ten Memorial Challenge	195.91	391.65
5	Alysa Liu	United States	2024 Budapest Trophy	192.77	2024 Golden Spin of Zagreb	197.71	390.48

=== Pairs ===
As of December 10, 2024.

No.	Team	Nation	First event	Score	Second event	Score	Total score
1	Ellie Kam; Daniel O'Shea	United States	2024 John Nicks Pairs Competition	191.62	2024 Nebelhorn Trophy	184.38	376.00
2	Alisa Efimova; Misha Mitrofanov	United States	2024 John Nicks Pairs Competition	188.88	2024 Nebelhorn Trophy	178.03	366.91
3	Rebecca Ghilardi; Filippo Ambrosini	Italy	2024 John Nicks Pairs Competition	172.61	2024 Lombardia Trophy	192.47	365.08
4	Ioulia Chtchetinina; Michał Woźniak	Poland	2024 Nebelhorn Trophy	174.22	2024 Golden Spin of Zagreb	185.50	359.72
5	Anastasia Vaipan-Law; Luke Digby	Great Britain	2024 Nebelhorn Trophy	174.68	2024 Warsaw Cup	182.37	357.05

=== Ice dance ===
As of December 10, 2024.

No.	Team	Nation	First event	Score	Second event	Score	Total score
1	Lilah Fear; Lewis Gibson	Great Britain	2024 Nebelhorn Trophy	207.01	2024 Nepela Memorial	210.65	417.66
2	Evgenia Lopareva; Geoffrey Brissaud	France	2024 Tallinn Trophy	198.91	2024 Warsaw Cup	201.89	400.80
3	Christina Carreira; Anthony Ponomarenko	United States	2024 Nebelhorn Trophy	197.51	2024 Budapest Trophy	194.69	392.20
4	Emilea Zingas; Vadym Kolesnik	United States	2024 Nebelhorn Trophy	194.34	2024 Warsaw Cup	196.56	390.41
5	Diana Davis; Gleb Smolkin	Georgia	2024 Nepela Memorial	201.87	2024 Golden Spin of Zagreb	179.31	381.18
