= Robert McCall (figure skater) =

Canadian ice dancer (1958–1991)

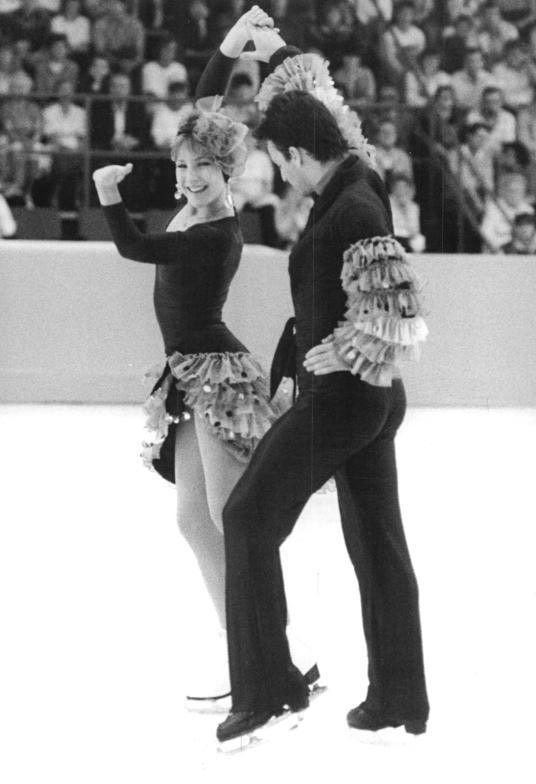
- Robert McCall and Tracy Wilson in 1985.

Personal information
- Full name: Robert McCall
- Born: September 14, 1958 Halifax, Nova Scotia, Canada
- Died: November 15, 1991 (aged 33) Ottawa, Ontario, Canada
- Height: 1.75 m (5 ft 9 in)

Figure skating career
- Country: Canada
- Skating club: Halifax SC
- Retired: 1988
Medal record
Figure skating
Ice dancing
Representing Canada
Olympic Games
Bronze medal – third place	1988 Calgary	Ice dancing
World Championships
Bronze medal – third place	1986 Geneva	Ice dancing
Bronze medal – third place	1987 Cincinnati	Ice dancing
Bronze medal – third place	1988 Budapest	Ice dancing

Robert "Rob" McCall, CM (September 14, 1958 – November 15, 1991) was a Canadian ice dancer. With partner Tracy Wilson, he was the 1988 Olympic bronze medallist.

== Biography ==
McCall was born in Halifax, Nova Scotia. He moved to Toronto when he teamed up with Tracy Wilson.

McCall competed with Marie McNeil early in his career. They were the 1975 Canadian novice silver medallists, 1977 Canadian junior national champions, 1978 & 1979 Canadian senior bronze medallists, 1980 silver medallists, and the 1981 national champions. They placed 13th at the 1980 World Figure Skating Championships and the 1981 World Figure Skating Championships.

Following that season, McCall teamed up with Tracy Wilson and skated with her until his death. They were the 1982-1988 Canadian national champions and three-time World bronze medallists. They placed 8th at the 1984 Winter Olympics and won the bronze medal at the 1988 Winter Olympics.

They turned professional in 1988 and skated professionally together. They toured with Stars On Ice, and won the World Professional Figure Skating Championships in 1989.

In 1988, Wilson and McCall were made a Member of the Order of Canada.

In March 1990, whilst in Portland, Maine, on tour with a show, McCall became critically ill with pneumonia. He was diagnosed with AIDS. Hoping to be able to continue to skate professionally in the United States (which then had restrictive immigration and customs laws barring persons with AIDS) he kept the nature of his illness secret However, his health deteriorated and he died of AIDS-related brain cancer on November 15, 1991, at age 33. It was an open secret that he was gay.

In 2018 McCall was named one of the greatest 15 athletes in Nova Scotia's history.

== Results ==
(with Marie McNeil)

Event	1975-76	1976–77	1977–78	1978–79	1979–80	1980–81
World Championships					13th	13th
World Junior Championships		3rd				
Canadian Championships	7th J	1st J	3rd	3rd	2nd	1st
Skate Canada International			8th	8th		3rd

(with Tracy Wilson)

Event	1981–82	1982–83	1983–84	1984–85	1985–86	1986–87	1987–88
Winter Olympic Games			8th				3rd
World Championships	10th	6th	6th	4th	3rd	3rd	3rd
Canadian Championships	1st	1st	1st	1st	1st	1st	1st
Skate Canada International		2nd	1st				1st
