= 2024 CS Cranberry Cup International =

Figure skating competition in Norwood, Massachusetts

- Type: ISU Challenger Series
- Date: August 8 – 11
- Season: 2024–25
- Location: Norwood, Massachusetts, United States
- Host: U.S. Figure Skating
- Venue: Skating Club of Boston

Champions
- Men's singles: (United States) Lucas Broussard
- Women's singles: (United States) Sarah Everhardt
- Next: 2025 CS Cranberry Cup International
- Next CS: 2024 CS John Nicks International Pairs Competition

The 2024 CS Cranberry Cup International was held on August 8–11, 2024, in Norwood, Massachusetts, in the United States. It was the first event of the 2024–25 ISU Challenger Series. Medals were awarded in men's and women's singles.

== Entries ==
The International Skating Union published the list of entries on July 24, 2024.

Country	Men	Women
Canada	Roman Sadovsky	Madeline Schizas
Czech Republic	—	Eliška Březinová
Czech Republic	—	Barbora Vránková
France	Luc Economides	—
Great Britain	Tao Macrae	—
Malaysia	—	Katherine Ong Pui Kuan
Mexico	—	Eugenia Garza Martinez
Spain	—	Emilia Murdock
South Korea	Kim Hyun-gyeom	Yun Ah-sun
United States	Lucas Broussard	Starr Andrews
United States	Tomoki Hiwatashi	Sarah Everhardt
United States	Liam Kapeikis	Sonja Hilmer
United States	Jimmy Ma	Isabeau Levito
United States	Yaroslav Paniot	Elyce Lin-Gracey
United States	Camden Pulkinen	Clare Seo
United States	Andrew Torgashev	Wren Warne-Jacobsen
United States	Michael Xie	—

=== Changes to preliminary assignments ===
Date	Discipline	Withdrew	Ref.
July 25	Men	(Armenia) Semen Daniliants	
July 25	Women	(Israel) Mariia Seniuk	
July 29	Women	(Armenia) Gayane Stepanyan	
August 2	Women	(United States) Lindsay Thorngren	
August 10	Women	(Argentina) Sophia Natalie Dayan	
August 10	Women	(Argentina) Michelle Di Cicco	
August 10	Women	(Mexico) Andrea Astrain Maynez	
August 10	Women	(Mexico) Andrea Montesinos Cantú	
August 10	Men	(Israel) Mark Gorodnitsky	

== Results ==
=== Men's singles ===
Men's results
Rank	Skater	Nation	Total points	SP		FS	
1st place, gold medalist(s)	Lucas Broussard	United States	246.48	1	85.77	1	160.71
2nd place, silver medalist(s)	Luc Economides	France	236.87	4	81.57	3	155.30
3rd place, bronze medalist(s)	Jimmy Ma	United States	236.77	7	78.24	2	158.53
4	Camden Pulkinen	United States	226.97	8	77.83	4	149.14
5	Andrew Torgashev	United States	224.94	3	84.30	6	140.64
6	Roman Sadovsky	Canada	224.70	6	80.50	5	144.20
7	Kim Hyun-gyeom	South Korea	217.42	5	81.15	8	136.27
8	Yaroslav Paniot	United States	206.59	10	69.78	7	136.81
9	Michael Xie	United States	198.73	9	74.56	10	124.17
10	Liam Kapeikis	United States	196.64	11	65.96	9	130.68
11	Tomoki Hiwatashi	United States	190.56	2	84.40	11	106.16
12	Tao Macrae	Great Britain	withdrew	12	46.73	withdrew from competition	

=== Women's singles ===
Women's results
Rank	Skater	Nation	Total points	SP		FS	
1st place, gold medalist(s)	Sarah Everhardt	United States	196.42	3	63.46	1	132.96
2nd place, silver medalist(s)	Elyce Lin-Gracey	United States	193.99	1	67.88	3	126.11
3rd place, bronze medalist(s)	Isabeau Levito	United States	193.81	2	65.08	2	128.73
4	Yun Ah-sun	South Korea	185.57	4	60.46	4	125.11
5	Starr Andrews	United States	164.89	5	57.19	5	107.70
6	Madeline Schizas	Canada	155.52	9	49.84	6	105.68
7	Sonja Hilmer	United States	151.43	10	49.60	7	101.83
8	Clare Seo	United States	147.66	6	56.92	9	90.74
9	Wren Warne-Jacobsen	United States	141.63	8	50.86	8	90.77
10	Eliška Březinová	Czech Republic	126.15	7	52.38	11	73.77
11	Emilia Murdock	Spain	120.09	12	40.08	10	80.01
12	Barbora Vránková	Czech Republic	104.38	11	40.74	12	63.64
13	Eugenia Garza Martinez	Mexico	97.18	13	34.80	13	62.38
14	Katherine Ong Pui Kuan	Malaysia	89.12	14	31.73	14	57.39
