= Tracy Wilson =

Canadian ice dancer (born 1961)

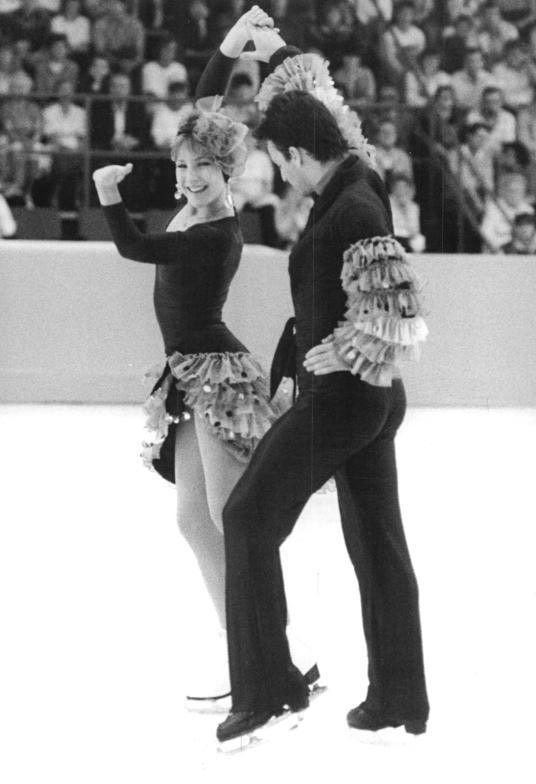
- Tracy Wilson and Robert McCall in 1985

Personal information
- Full name: Tracy Wilson
- Born: September 25, 1961 (age 65) Lachine, Quebec, Canada
- Height: 1.67 m (5 ft 6 in)

Figure skating career
- Country: Canada
- Skating club: Inlet Skating Club
- Retired: 1988
Medal record
Figure skating
Ice dancing
Representing Canada
Olympic Games
Bronze medal – third place	1988 Calgary	Ice dancing
World Championships
Bronze medal – third place	1986 Geneva	Ice dancing
Bronze medal – third place	1987 Cincinnati	Ice dancing
Bronze medal – third place	1988 Budapest	Ice dancing

Tracy Wilson, CM (born September 25, 1961) is a Canadian former competitive ice dancer. With partner Rob McCall, she won the Canadian national championship seven times (1982–1988), is a three-time World bronze medallist, and the 1988 Olympic bronze medallist.

== Personal life ==
Wilson was born on September 25, 1961, in Lachine, Quebec, Canada. She grew up in Port Moody, British Columbia. As child she did swimming and diving, competing at provincials three times. She first swam with the Coquitlam Sharks in 1967 before moving, in 1970, to Port Moody Aquarians. She attended college for one semester before her partnership with Rob McCall began.

In 1987, Wilson married Brad Kinsella. Though she did not change her name at the time, her name is sometimes printed as Tracy Wilson-Kinsella or Tracy Wilson Kinsella. Together they have three children – two sons who play hockey and a daughter who competes as an equestrian. They live in Toronto, Ontario.

== Skating career ==
Wilson started skating when she was six years old in Coquitlam. After moving she became a member of Port Moody's Inlet Skating Club. She competed in ice dancing for the first time when she was fifteen. On the junior level, Wilson competed with Mark Stokes. They were the 1980 Canadian junior national champions.

In the summer of 1981, Wilson teamed up with Rob McCall. Their partnership started at the Elgin Barrow Arena in Richmond Hill, Ontario, and they trained in Richmond Hill throughout their competitive careers. Together they won the Canadian national championship seven times, from 1982 to 1988. They won the Skate Canada International competition in 1983 and 1987. The 1983 gold was the first time a Canadian team won the event. The pair were three-time World bronze medallists (1986-1988). They competed at the 1984 Winter Olympic and the 1988 Winter Olympic, winning a bronze medal in the 1988 Games. That medal was Canada's first Olympic medal in ice dancing.

After the 1988 Worlds, they decided to go pro. They competed in professional competition, including winning the World Professional Championships in 1989. The team also performed with Stars on Ice for two years and other shows. In March/April 1990, McCall was diagnosed with AIDS and his health was deteriorating. Disregarding the mass public fear of AIDS at the time, Wilson continued to skate with McCall. The pair did some shows and skated at the 1990 World Professional Championships. Wilson had to stop skating with the birth of her first child in 1991. Soon after McCall deteriorated further and he died November 15, 1991. Wilson retired from ice dancing, but she did skate a solo, while pregnant with her second child, at the tribute show for McCall on November 21, 1992.

=== Results ===
(with McCall)

Event	1981–82	1982–83	1983–84	1984–85	1985–86	1986–87	1987–88	1988–89	1989–90	1990–91
Amateur
Olympics			8th				3rd			
Worlds	10th	6th	6th	4th	3rd	3rd	3rd			
Skate Canada		2nd	1st				1st			
Novarat Trophy						1st				
Prague Skate	4th									
St. Ivel		4th		1st						
Canadian Champs.	1st	1st	1st	1st	1st	1st	1st			
Professional
World Pro								2nd	1st	?
Challenge of Champions									3rd	

(with Stokes)

Amateur
Event	1979–80	1980–81
Nebelhorn Trophy		8th
Canadian Champs.	1st Jr	

== Coaching career ==
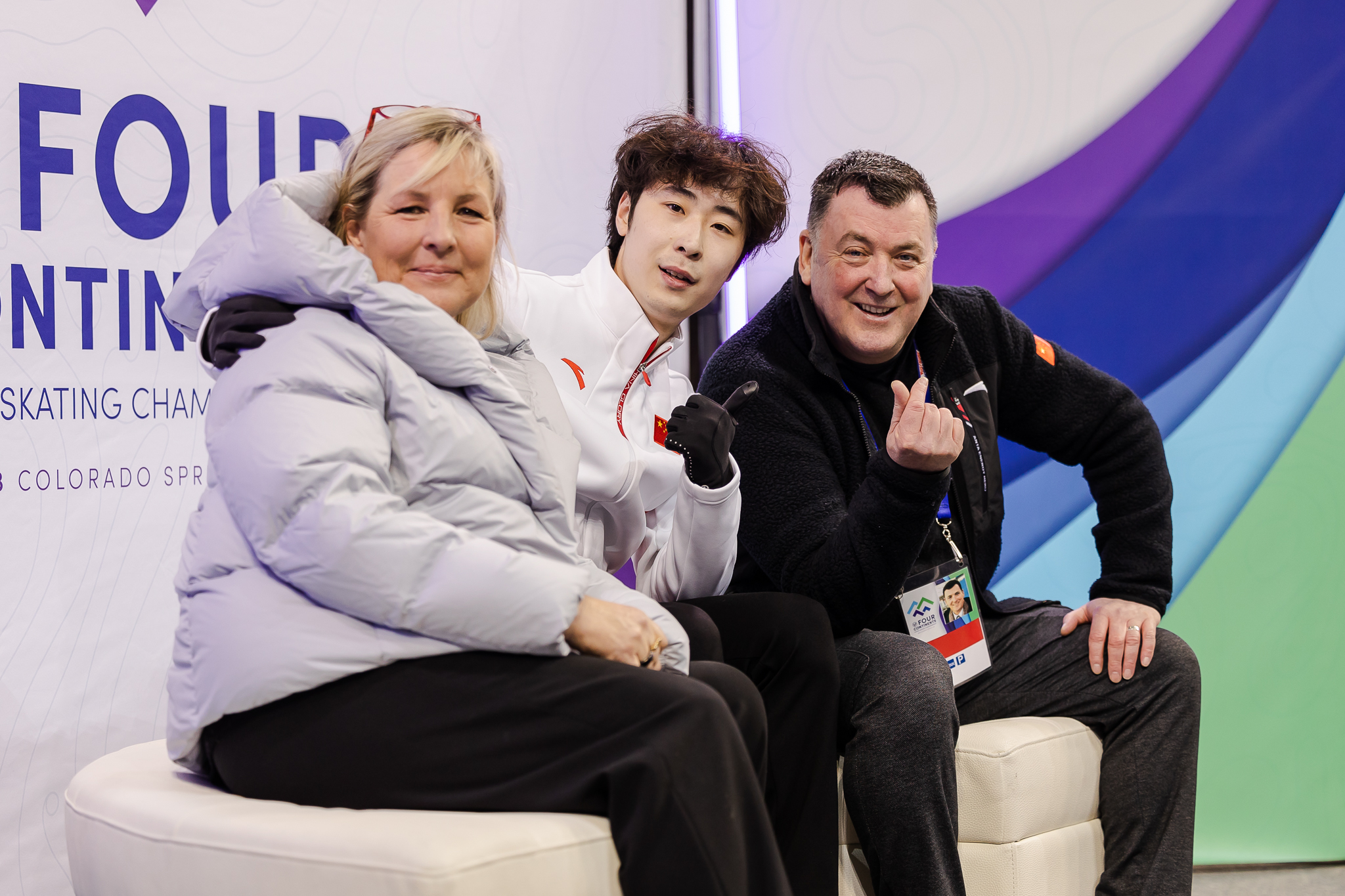
Wilson with Jin Boyang and Brian Orser at the 2023 Four Continents Championships.

In 2006, Wilson and Brian Orser were hired by the Toronto Cricket Skating and Curling Club as consultants to help rebuild the skating program. The two decided to stay and coach there, training kids, adults, and elite skaters.

Her current students include:

- (China) Jin Boyang
- (United States) Lucas Broussard
- (United States) Jason Brown
- (United States) Logan Higase-Chen
- (Thailand) Pimmpida Lerdpraiwan
- (United States) Daniel Martynov
- (Canada) Rio Morita
- (Canada) Kaiya Ruiter
- (Azerbaijan) Nargiz Süleymanova

Her former students include:

- (South Korea) Junhwan Cha
- (Spain) Javier Fernandez
- (Japan) Yuzuru Hanyu
- (Canada) Lubov Iliushechkina / Dylan Moscovitch
- (Japan) Rika Kihira
- (Spain) Sonia Lafuente
- (Russia) Evgenia Medvedeva
- (Spain) Emilia Murdock
- (Canada) Nam Nguyen
- (Japan) Shingo Nishiyama
- (South Korea) Shin Ji-a
- (Japan) Utana Yoshida / Shingo Nishiyama

== Other ventures ==
Since 1990, Wilson has worked as a television figure skating analyst for American and Canadian networks, including CBS, NBC, CBC, CTV (TSN), ABC, and Turner Sports (TNT). She has also written several articles for TSN's website.

Wilson has also done some choreography, including for Canadian junior ice dance team Edrea Khong / Edbert Khong.

Wilson is also an AIDS activist. She was one of the primary organizers of the "Skate the Dream: A Tribute to Rob McCall" ice show, a fundraiser for AIDS research, which took place on November 21, 1992.

She is an ambassador for S'port for Kids Foundation, a charitable organization whose goal is to involve kids in organized athletics.

== Awards and recognition ==
In 1988, Wilson and McCall were made Members of the Order of Canada. This is the highest civilian honor given by the Canadian government.

Wilson was also inducted into several halls of fame, including:

- 1989 – Canadian Olympic Hall of Fame
- 1991 – BC Sports Hall of Fame
- 1999 – Richmond Hill Sports Hall of Fame
- 2003 – Skate Canada Hall of Fame
- 2005 – BC Summer Swimming Association Pool of Fame

In 1995, the Tracy Wilson and Rob McCall Trophy was established to annually recognize a Canadian pairs team. Past winners included pairs in rowing, bobsleigh, and tennis.
