= Lucas Broussard =

American figure skater (born 2006)

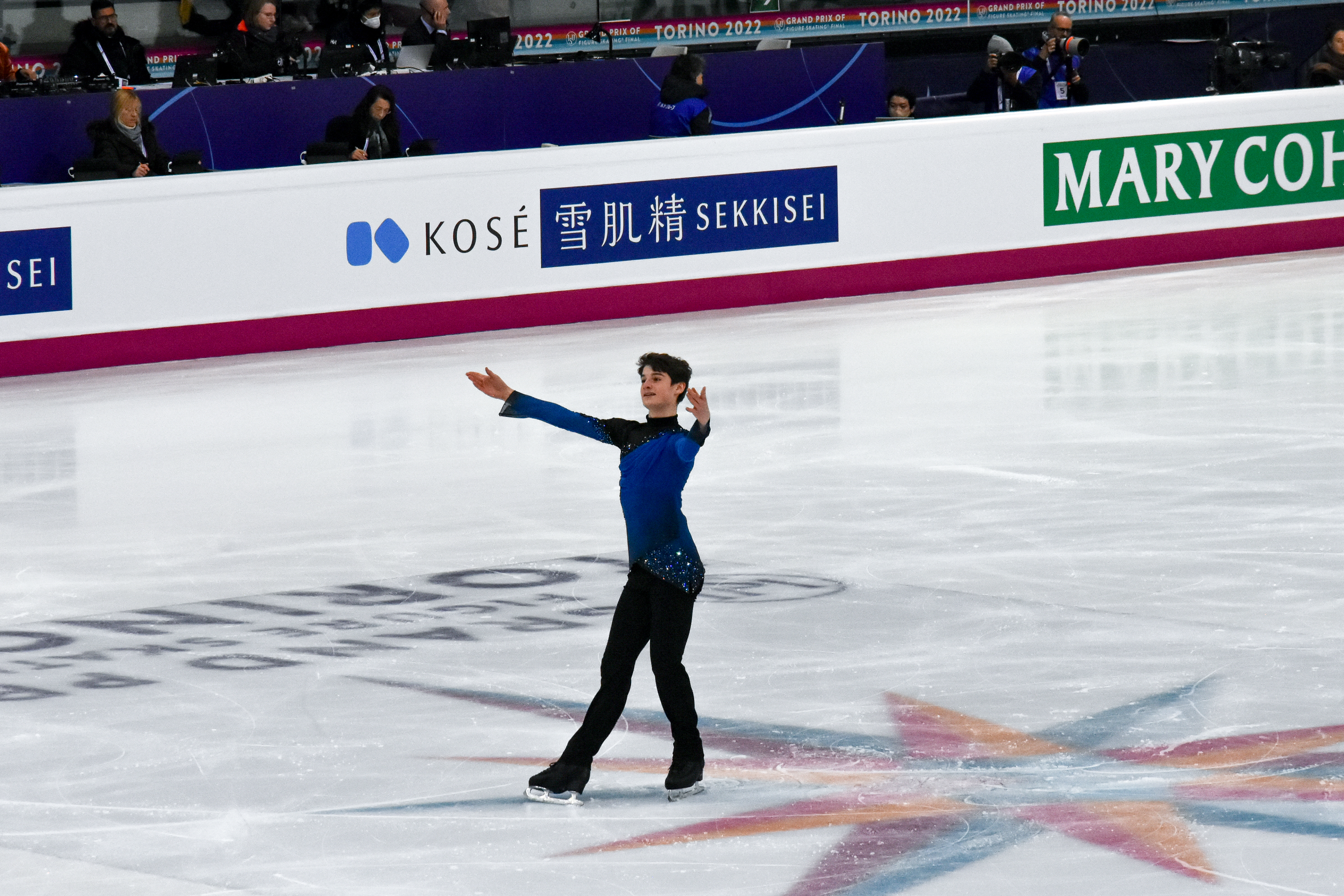
- Broussard at the 2022–23 Junior Grand Prix Final

Personal information
- Born: June 15, 2006 (age 20) Luxembourg City, Luxembourg
- Home town: Seattle, Washington, U.S.
- Height: 5 ft 11 in (1.80 m)

Figure skating career
- Country: United States
- Discipline: Men's singles
- Coach: Brian Orser; Tracy Wilson
- Skating club: Kraken Skating Academy
- Began skating: 2016

Medal record
Junior Grand Prix Final
Silver medal – second place	2022–23 Turin	Singles

Lucas Broussard (born June 15, 2006) is an American figure skater. He is the 2024 CS Cranberry Cup champion. On the Junior level, he is the 2022–23 Junior Grand Prix Final silver medalist, a three-time Junior Grand Prix Series medalist (two gold, one silver), and the 2023 U.S. National junior champion.

== Personal life ==
Broussard was born on June 15, 2006, in Luxembourg City, Luxembourg, to a French father and American mother. Broussard's father works at Amazon and his job had required the family to move to Luxembourg at the time. The family returned to Seattle, Washington, when Broussard was six years old. He has two brothers, Sebastian and Julien, an Australian Shepherd named Bear and a cat named Eric Cartman.

Prior to figure skating, Broussard was a competitive ski racer. His figure skating idols are Yuzuru Hanyu and Shoma Uno.

In 2025, he was admitted to Stanford University and plans to enroll in the fall of 2026.

== Career ==
=== Early career ===
Broussard began figure skating in 2016 at the age of nine and was coached by Darin Hosier and Corrie Martin until 2025.

He won the 2019 U.S. Championships as a juvenile. Two years later, he placed sixth at the 2021 U.S. Junior Championships.

=== 2021–2022 season: Junior international debut ===
Broussard made his international debut on the 2021–22 Junior Grand Prix. He began his season with winning a silver medal at the 2021 JGP France I behind fellow American, Ilia Malinin. He then went on to finish eighth at the 2021 JGP Russia.

Due to a back injury, Broussard withdrew from the 2022 U.S. Junior Championships. Despite this, Broussard was still selected to compete at the 2022 World Junior Championships, but withdrew due to the nagging back injury.

=== 2022–2023 season: Junior Grand Prix Final silver ===
Competing on the 2022–23 Junior Grand Prix, Broussard began his season by winning gold at both of his assigned Junior Grand Prix events in Poland and Italy, respectively. These results allowed Broussard to qualify for the 2022–23 Junior Grand Prix Final in Turin, Italy.

At the Final, Broussard won the short program, scoring a new personal best. Despite skating a solid free skate, Broussard placed third in that segment of the competition after three of his jumping passes were downgraded.

Competing at the 2023 U.S. Junior Championships, Broussard placed first in both the short and free program segments of the event, winning the gold medal by almost twenty-six points and setting a U.S. National Junior Men's record for combined total score.

Broussard was selected to compete at the 2023 World Junior Championships in Calgary, Alberta. Broussard placed fourth in the short program after stepping out of a planned triple axel, but ninth in the free skate after skating an error-ridden program. Broussard dropped to seventh-place overall.

=== 2023–2024 season: Senior international debut ===
Broussard began the season with a fourth-place finish at the 2023 Nebelhorn Trophy. He was invited to make his Grand Prix debut at the 2023 Cup of China. After experiencing boot issues with his left skate in practice and skating with a back-up boot in competition, he finished twelfth of twelve skaters.

In January, Broussard withdrew from the 2024 U.S. Championships prior to the short program for medical reasons.

=== 2024–2025 season: Challenger Series gold ===
Broussard started the season by winning gold at the 2024 Cranberry Cup International, earning personal best scores in all three segments. He went on to compete on the 2024–25 Grand Prix series, finishing tenth at the 2024 Skate America. In November, Broussard announced that he had fractured his pelvis and would be forced to miss the remainder of the season.

In May, Broussard announced that he had relocated to Toronto, Ontario, to train at the Toronto Cricket, Skating and Curling Club under coaches Brian Orser and Tracy Wilson.

=== 2025–2026 season ===
Although assigned to compete at 2025 Skate Canada International and 2025 Finlandia Trophy, Broussard ultimately withdrew from both events.

== Programs ==
Season	Short program	Free skate	Exhibition	Ref.
2020–21	Morpheus Cello Concerto III, Mvt. 3 By Oliver Davis Choreo. by Corrie Martin	Piano Concerto No. 2 in C minor; Rhapsody on a Theme of Paganini By Sergei Rachmaninoff Choreo. by Corrie Martin	—N/a	
2021–22	"Gin Tonic" By Parov Stelar Choreo. by Corrie Martin	"Yellow Moon" By Luca D'Alberto Choreo. by Corrie Martin	—N/a	
2022–23	Adiós Nonino By Astor Piazzolla Performed by Forever Tango Choreo. by Corrie Martin	Theme from The Leftovers By Max Richter; Compassion By Ilya Beshevli Choreo. by Corrie Martin	"Hello Again"; "Sweet Caroline" By Neil Diamond	
2023–24	"Everybody Hurts" By R.E.M. Choreo. by Corrie Martin	The Four Seasons By Antonio Vivaldi Performed by Max Richter Choreo. by Corrie Martin	—N/a	
2024–25	"Thème de l’absence" (From Joyeux Noël) By Renaud Capuçon, Les Siècles, & Philippe Rombi Choreo. by Corrie Martin	The Four Seasons By Antonio Vivaldi Performed by Max Richter Choreo. by Corrie Martin	"Everybody Hurts"	
2025–26	"Poeta el en Viento" By Vicente Amigo Choreo. by David Wilson	The Mission; Gabriel's Oboe; Falls; Vita Nostra By Ennio Morricone Choreo. by David Wilson		

== Competitive highlights ==
- GP – Event of the ISU Grand Prix Series
- JGP – Event of the ISU Junior Grand Prix Series
- CS – Event of the ISU Challenger Series

Competition placements at senior level
Season	2023–24	2024–25	2026–27
GP Cup of China	12th		
GP Skate America		10th	
CS Cranberry Cup	14th	1st	
CS Nebelhorn Trophy	4th		
CS Warsaw Cup			TBD

Competition placements at junior level
Season	2020–21	2021–22	2022–23
World Junior Championships			7th
Junior Grand Prix Final			2nd
U.S. Championships	6th		1st
JGP France		2nd	
JGP Italy			1st
JGP Poland			1st
JGP Russia		8th	

== Detailed results ==
ISU personal best scores in the +5/-5 GOE System
Segment	Type	Score	Event
Total	TSS	246.48	2024 CS Cranberry Cup International
Short program	TSS	85.77	2024 CS Cranberry Cup International
Short program	TES	47.53	2024 CS Cranberry Cup International
Short program	PCS	38.24	2024 CS Cranberry Cup International
Free skating	TSS	160.71	2024 CS Cranberry Cup International
Free skating	TES	83.79	2024 CS Cranberry Cup International
Free skating	PCS	77.92	2024 CS Cranberry Cup International

=== Senior level ===
Results in the 2023–24 season
Date	Event	SP		FS		Total	
Date	Event	P	Score	P	Score	P	Score
Aug 10–14, 2023	(United States) 2023 Cranberry Cup International	13	60.38	11	113.93	14	174.31
Sep 21–22, 2023	(Germany) 2023 CS Nebelhorn Trophy	4	69.99	4	146.11	4	216.10
Nov 10–12, 2023	2023 Cup of China	12	61.05	12	120.10	12	181.15

Results in the 2024–25 season
Date	Event	SP		FS		Total	
Date	Event	P	Score	P	Score	P	Score
Aug 8–11, 2024	(United States) 2024 CS Cranberry Cup International	1	85.77	1	160.71	1	246.48
Oct 18–20, 2024	(United States) 2024 Skate America	11	65.31	8	141.26	10	206.57

Results in the 2026–27 season
Date	Event	SP		FS		Total	
Date	Event	P	Score	P	Score	P	Score
Nov 25–29, 2026	(Poland) 2026 CS Warsaw Cup						

=== Junior level ===
Results in the 2020–21 season
Date	Event	SP		FS		Total	
Date	Event	P	Score	P	Score	P	Score
Jan 9–21, 2021	(United States) 2021 U.S. Championships (Junior)	12	55.06	4	120.43	6	175.49

Results in the 2021–22 season
Date	Event	SP		FS		Total	
Date	Event	P	Score	P	Score	P	Score
Aug 18–21, 2021	2021 JGP France	3	62.65	2	129.66	2	192.31
Sep 15–18, 2021	2021 JGP Russia	7	64.00	5	134.77	8	198.77

Results in the 2022–23 season
Date	Event	SP		FS		Total	
Date	Event	P	Score	P	Score	P	Score
Sep 28 – Oct 1, 2022	2022 JGP Poland I	5	69.12	2	140.27	1	209.39
Oct 12–15, 2022	2022 JGP Italy	1	74.79	2	136.35	1	211.14
Dec 8–11, 2022	(Italy) 2022–23 Junior Grand Prix Final	1	81.11	2	139.32	2	220.43
Jan 21–29, 2023	(United States) 2023 U.S. Championships (Junior)	1	82.03	1	157.52	1	239.55
Feb 27 – Mar 5, 2023	(Canada) 2023 World Junior Championships	4	77.01	9	132.46	7	209.47
