= Sarah Everhardt =

American figure skater (born 2006)

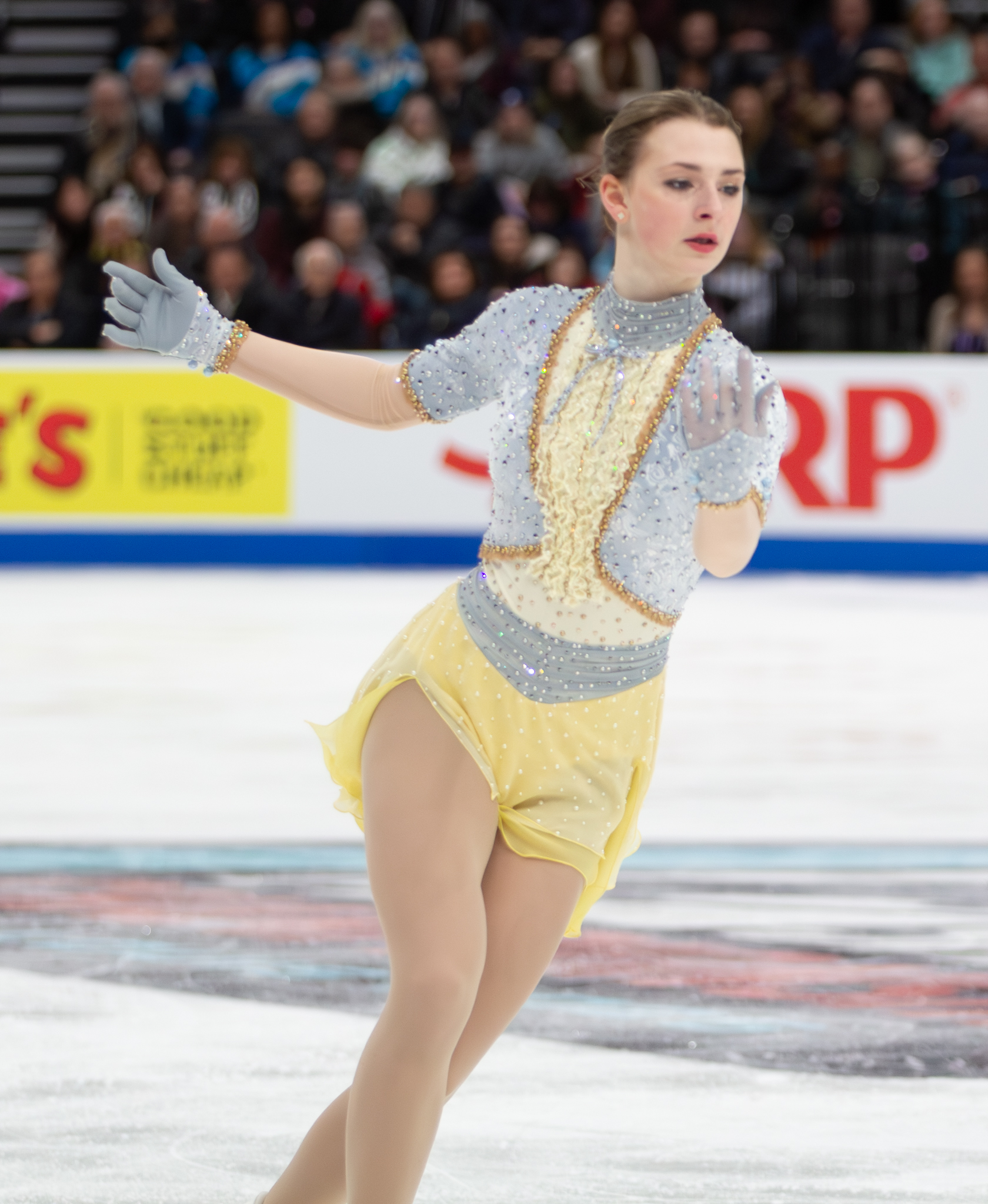
- Everhardt at the 2026 U.S. Championships

Personal information
- Full name: Sarah Elizabeth Everhardt
- Born: November 12, 2006 (age 19) Cherry Point, North Carolina, U.S.
- Home town: Haymarket, Virginia, U.S.
- Height: 5 ft 4 in (1.63 m)

Figure skating career
- Country: United States
- Discipline: Women's singles
- Coach: Tatiana Malinina; Roman Skorniakov
- Skating club: Washington Figure Skating Club
- Began skating: 2012

Medal record
Four Continents Championships
Bronze medal – third place	2025 Seoul	Singles
U.S. Championships
Bronze medal – third place	2025 Wichita	Singles

Sarah Elizabeth Everhardt (born November 12, 2006) is an American figure skater. She is the 2025 Four Continents bronze medalist, a four-time Challenger Series medalist, 2025 U.S. national bronze medalist, and 2024 U.S. national pewter medalist.

== Personal life ==
Sarah Elizabeth Everhardt was born on November 12, 2006, to Jonathan and Ekaterina Everhardt. She is of Irish and Belarusian descent, and is fluent in English and Russian. Prior to becoming a figure skater, she tried out multiple sports such as swimming and gymnastics.

Everhardt is a graduate of Battlefield High School in Haymarket, Virginia, where she attended both in-person and online classes.

Outside of skating, she enjoys painting, drawing and Harry Potter. She plans to attend American University, as it is close to her training rink, SkateQuest, located in Reston, Virginia. She intends to major in either psychology or neuroscience. Everhardt is a fan of figure skaters Evgenia Medvedeva and Wakaba Higuchi.

== Career ==
=== Early career ===
Everhardt began skating at the age of five. In 2019, she started training under Tatiana Malinina and Roman Skorniakov. Debuting at the 2022 U.S Junior Championships, she finished eleventh.

=== Junior career ===
==== 2022–23 season: Junior Grand Prix debut ====
Everhardt made her international junior debut at 2022 JGP France in Courchevel, where she placed tenth overall. After winning the bronze medal at 2023 U.S. Eastern Sectional Championship, she qualified for the 2023 U.S Junior Figure Skating Championships and finished thirteenth.

==== 2023–24 season ====
Everhardt started the season with a gold medal at 2023 Chesapeake Open and went on to win the silver medal at 2023 Glacier Falls Summer Classic behind compatriot and training mate, Audrey Shin. Competing at her second JGP assignment in Poland, she placed fourth and fifth in the short and free program, respectively, but finished sixth overall

Debuting at her first senior national championship at 2024 U.S Figure Skating Championships, Everhardt placed sixth after the short program and went on to placed third in the free skate. Overall, she finished fourth and won the pewter medal. She shared "I've never skated in front of such an awesome crowd - great to see everyone supporting me and kind of skating with me."

=== Senior career ===
==== 2024–25 season: Senior Grand Prix debut and Four Continents bronze medal ====
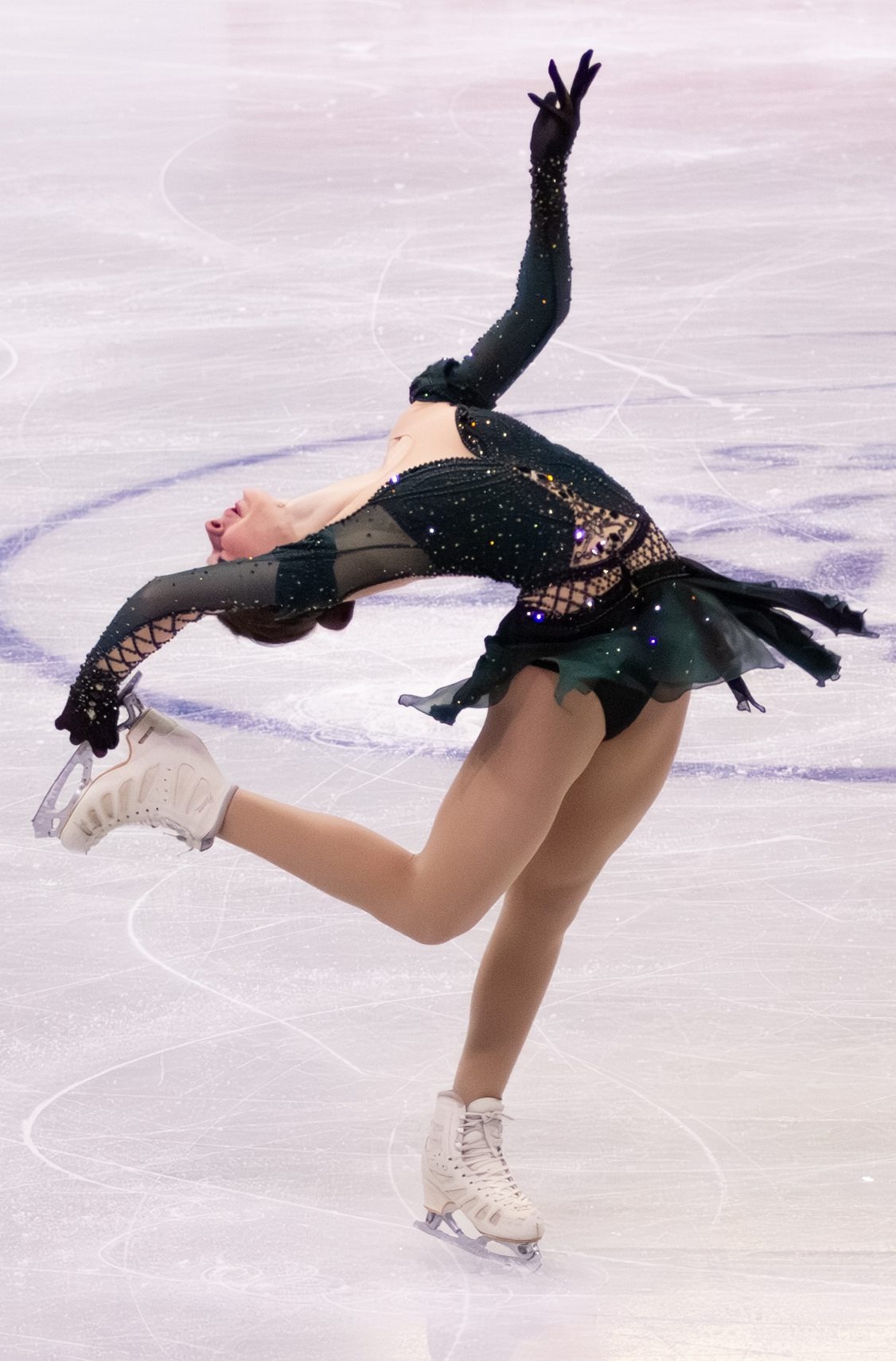
Everhardt performing a catch foot layback spin during her short program at 2025 Skate Canada International

Everhardt began the season by winning gold at the 2024 Cranberry Cup International. She went on to compete at the 2024 Lombardia Trophy, where she won the silver medal.

Although not originally assigned to compete on the 2024–25 Grand Prix series, in mid-September, Everhardt was entered at the 2024 Finlandia Trophy following the withdrawal of You Young. She placed fourth overall at this event. "Overall, I felt more free and relaxed in comparison to France, so this is something positive." One month later, she was entered at the 2024 Grand Prix de France following Loena Hendrickx's withdrawal. At the Grand Prix de France, Everhardt delivered two solid performances, placing fourth in both the short program and free skate segments, and finishing fifth overall. She followed this result up with another fourth-place finish at the Finlandia Trophy.

In January, Everhardt competed at the 2025 U.S. Championships in Wichita, Kansas. She placed fourth in the short program and third in the free skate, winning the bronze medal overall behind Amber Glenn and Alysa Liu. Everhardt credited confidence in regard to her impressive jumping passes and consistency at the event. “I know I can do it, so I go and do it,” she said. “A lot of people say I have no nerves, but that’s really not true. I get so nervous, like really nervous, but I’ve sort of found a way to control them during my skate.”

Assigned to compete at the 2025 Four Continents Championships in Seoul, South Korea the following month, Everhardt delivered two clean programs, placing third in both the short and free program segments of the competition, and capturing the bronze medal overall. In an interview following the event, she said, "It's kind of hard to put in a words, I am a little speechless. It’s the first ISU championship and I get a medal, so it's really cool. I'm glad I was able to fight and skate well."

On March 2, 2025, Everhardt took part in Legacy on Ice, an ice show organized by U.S. Figure Skating that paid tribute to lives lost aboard American Eagle Flight 5342.

==== 2025–26 season: World Championships debut ====
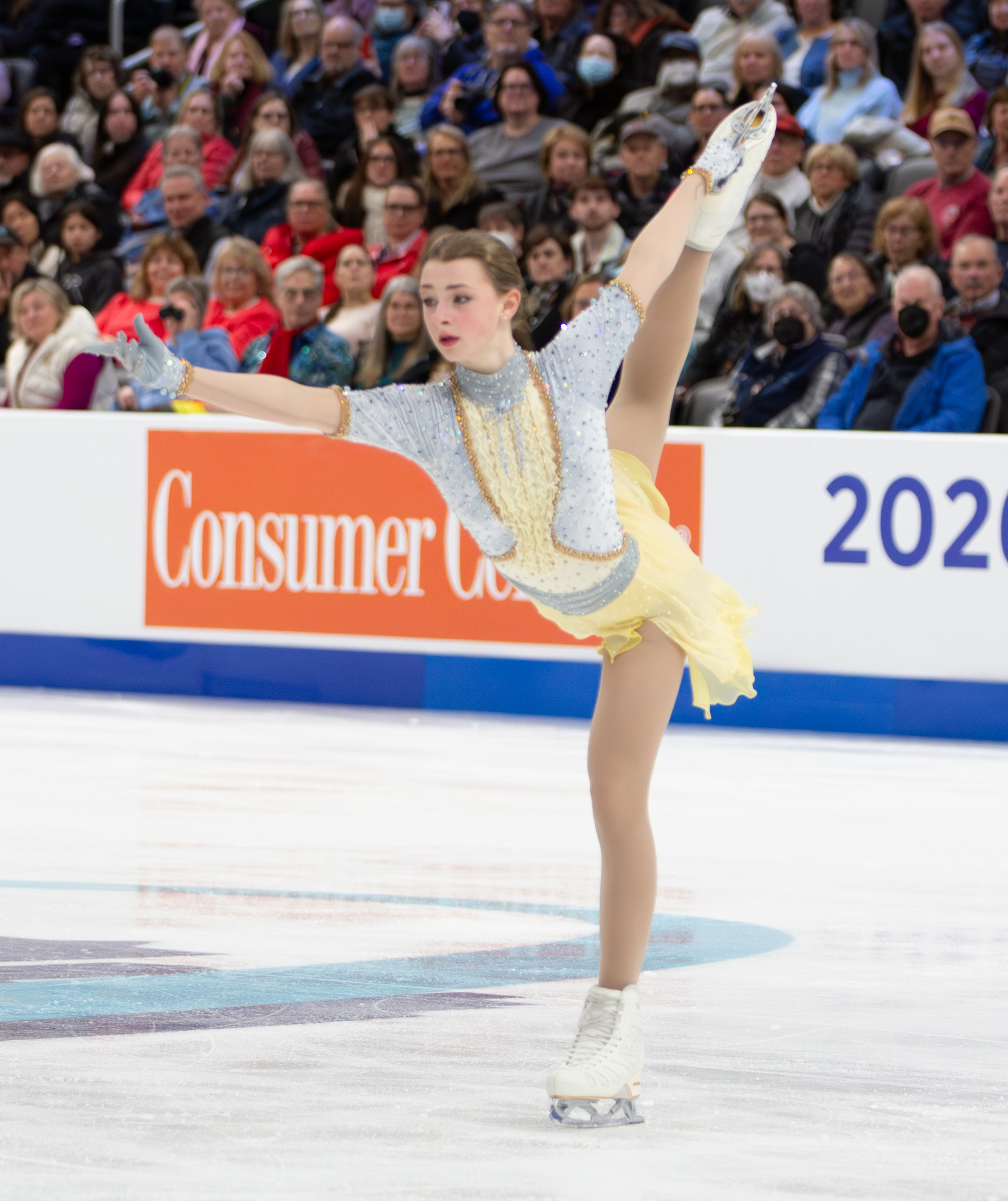
Everhardt performing a catch-foot spiral during her free skate at the 2026 U.S. Championships

Everhardt opened her season by winning the bronze medal at the 2025 CS Lombardia Trophy. She then went on to compete on the 2025–26 Grand Prix series, finishing seventh at 2025 Skate Canada International and fifth at the 2025 NHK Trophy.

In January, Everhardt finished fifth at the 2026 U.S. Championships. She was subsequently named to the 2026 Four Continents team, where she finished in eighth place.

In early March, Everhardt was called up to compete at the 2026 World Championships following the withdrawal of Alysa Liu due to reigning U.S national pewter medalist and first alternate, Bradie Tennell, declining the offer to replace Liu. She elected to bring back her "Firebird" free skate for the occasion. She finished in eleventh place overall after placing ninth in the short program and eleventh in the free skate. "I mean, it’s okay," she said following her placement. "It would have been cool if I was a little bit higher up, but it’s whatever. I try to look at what I did in my skating, and I’m happy with my performance. So that means I’m happy with the overall result."

==== 2026–27 season ====
During the off season it was announced that Everhardt had been dealing with stress fractures in both feet, opting to not compete on the early season Challenger Series events. Additionally, she worked alongside new choreographers, Lori Nichol and Carolina Kostner to create her new free program.

Everhardt opened the new season at the 2026 Grand Prix de France, after placing ninth in the short program due to falling on her intended triple-triple combination, she rose to seventh place overall after performing an almost clean free program. "I wouldn't call it a redemption skate" says Everhardt, "because I know I can skate much better. A redemption skate would mean everything was clean. That's something to work towards, and hopefully I'll be able to skate two clean programs soon."

== Programs ==
Season	Short program	Free skating	Exhibition
2021–2022	Don Quixote by Ludwig Minkus	Skyfall by Adele	
2022–2023	Call Me Cruella (from Cruella) by Florence and the Machine choreo. by Nadezhda Kanaeva	Modigliani by Guy Farley choreo. by Nadezhda Kanaeva	
2023–2024	I'll Take Care of You by Brook Benton performed by Beth Hart & Joe Bonamassa choreo. by Nadezhda Kanaeva	The Four Seasons: Winter by Antonio Vivaldi choreo. by Nadezhda Kanaeva	
2024–2025	Reel Around the Sun (from Riverdance) by Bill Whelan choreo. by Shae-Lynn Bourne	The Firebird; Appearance of the Firebird, Pursued by Ivan Tsarevitch; The Palace Disappears and Kashchei's Spells are Broken, The Stone Knights Return to Life — General Rejoicing; Infernal Dance of Kashchei's Subjects by Igor Stravinsky performed by Chicago Symphony Orchestra & Pierre Boulez choreo. by Nadezhda Kanaeva	I'll Take Care of You by Brook Benton performed by Beth Hart & Joe Bonamassa choreo. by Nadezhda Kanaeva
2025–2026	Reel Around the Sun (from Riverdance) by Bill Whelan choreo. by Shae-Lynn Bourne	Poor Things; Portuguese Dance I; "I Just Hope She's Alright"; Bella / Les Yeux Bleus / Estore's Song by Jerskin Fendrix; O quarto by Carminho; "Poor Things" Finale and End Credits by Jerskin Fendrix choreo. by Shae-Lynn Bourne; The Firebird	
2026–2027	Danse macabre in G Minor, Op. 40 by Camille Saint-Saëns choreo. by Shae-Lynn Bourne	Rain, In Your Black Eyes by Ezio Bosso choreo. by Lori Nichol & Carolina Kostner	

== Competitive highlights ==
- GP – Event of the ISU Grand Prix Series
- JGP – Event of the ISU Junior Grand Prix Series
- CS – Event of the ISU Challenger Series
- TBD – Assigned
- WD – Withdrew from competition

Competition placements at senior level
Season	2023–24	2024–25	2025–26	2026–27
World Championships			11th	
Four Continents Championships		3rd	8th	
U.S. Championships	4th	3rd	5th	
GP Finland		4th		
GP France		5th		7th
GP NHK Trophy			5th	TBD
GP Skate Canada			7th	
CS Cranberry Cup	6th	1st		
CS Lombardia Trophy		2nd	3rd	
CS Tallinn Trophy			2nd	

Competition placements at junior level
Season	2021–22	2022–23	2023–24
U.S. Championships	11th	13th	
JGP France		10th	
JGP Poland			6th
Egna Spring Trophy	7th		
Philadelphia Summer		1st	

== Detailed results ==
ISU personal best scores in the +5/-5 GOE System
Segment	Type	Score	Event
Total	TSS	201.90	2024 CS Lombardia Trophy
Short program	TSS	69.13	2024 CS Lombardia Trophy
Short program	TES	37.07	2024 CS Lombardia Trophy
Short program	PCS	32.06	2024 CS Lombardia Trophy
Free skating	TSS	132.96	2024 CS Cranberry Cup International
Free skating	TES	73.15	2024 CS Cranberry Cup International
Free skating	PCS	63.60	2025 CS Lombardia Trophy

=== Senior level ===
Results in the 2023–24 season
Date	Event	SP		FS		Total	
Date	Event	P	Score	P	Score	P	Score
Aug 11–14, 2023	(United States) 2023 Cranberry Cup International	6	52.38	4	108.73	6	161.11
Jan 22–28, 2024	(United States) 2024 U.S. Championships	6	63.21	3	130.16	4	193.47

Results in the 2024–25 season
Date	Event	SP		FS		Total	
Date	Event	P	Score	P	Score	P	Score
Aug 8–11, 2024	(United States) 2024 CS Cranberry Cup International	3	63.46	1	132.96	1	196.42
Sep 12–15, 2024	(Italy) 2024 CS Lombardia Trophy	3	69.13	2	132.77	2	201.90
Nov 1–3, 2024	2024 Grand Prix de France	4	66.95	4	129.99	5	196.94
Nov 15–17, 2024	(Finland) 2024 Finlandia Trophy	3	66.28	5	124.89	4	191.17
Jan 20–26, 2025	(United States) 2025 U.S. Championships	4	70.72	3	136.64	3	207.36
Feb 19–23, 2025	(South Korea) 2025 Four Continents Championships	3	67.36	3	132.67	3	200.03

Results in the 2025–26 season
Date	Event	SP		FS		Total	
Date	Event	P	Score	P	Score	P	Score
Sep 11–14, 2025	(Italy) 2025 CS Lombardia Trophy	2	69.16	3	130.75	3	199.91
Oct 31 – Nov 2, 2025	2025 Skate Canada International	7	63.47	9	111.12	7	174.59
Nov 7–9, 2025	(Japan) 2025 NHK Trophy	6	61.41	6	125.28	5	186.69
Nov 25–30, 2025	(Estonia) 2025 CS Tallinn Trophy	2	66.83	4	118.05	2	184.88
Jan 4–11, 2026	(United States) 2026 U.S. Championships	4	71.10	5	138.37	5	209.47
Jan 21–25, 2026	(China) 2026 Four Continents Championships	5	67.51	11	115.21	8	182.72
Mar 24–29, 2026	(Czech Republic) 2026 World Championships	9	68.74	11	128.69	11	197.43

Results in the 2026–27 season
Date	Event	SP		FS		Total	
Date	Event	P	Score	P	Score	P	Score
Oct 23–25, 2026	2026 Grand Prix de France	9	60.73	6	123.89	7	184.62

=== Junior level ===
Results in the 2021–22 season
Date	Event	SP		FS		Total	
Date	Event	P	Score	P	Score	P	Score
Jan 2–9, 2022	(United States) 2022 U.S. Championships	11	48.47	10	88.32	11	136.79
Apr 7–10, 2022	(Italy) 2022 Egna Spring Trophy	12	42.90	4	97.04	7	139.94

Results in the 2022–23 season
Date	Event	SP		FS		Total	
Date	Event	P	Score	P	Score	P	Score
Aug 4–7, 2022	(United States) 2022 Philadelphia Summer International	1	53.79	1	91.20	1	144.99
Aug 24–27, 2022	2022 JGP France	8	52.93	10	91.20	10	144.13
Jan 21–29, 2023	(United States) 2023 U.S. Championships	11	49.26	13	87.82	13	137.08

Results in the 2023–24 season
Date	Event	SP		FS		Total	
Date	Event	P	Score	P	Score	P	Score
Sep 27–30, 2023	2023 JGP Poland	4	60.19	5	108.50	6	168.69
