= Damon Allen (figure skater) =

American figure skater

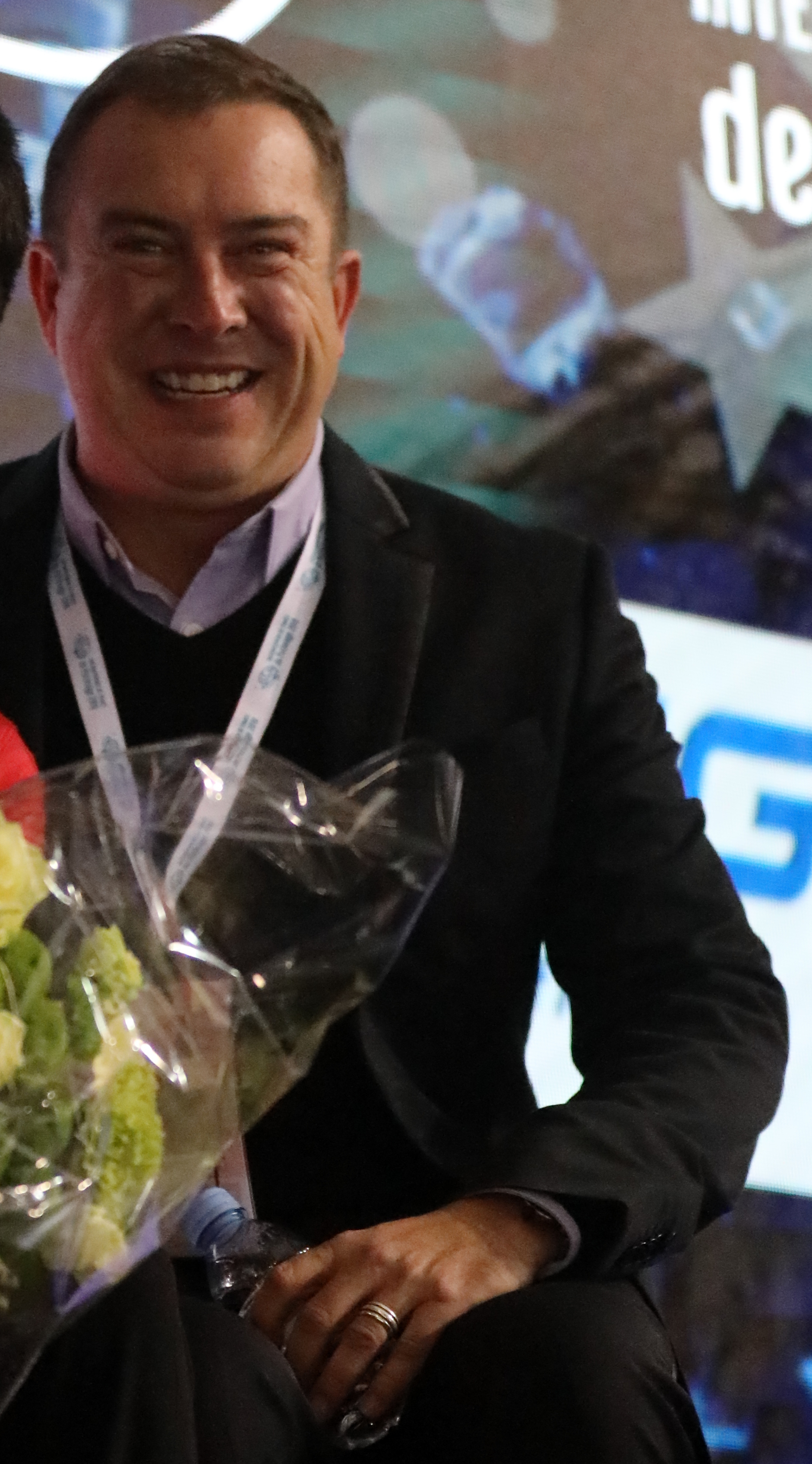

Personal information
- Born: 12 April 1973 (age 53) Winston-Salem, North Carolina
- Home town: Rockford, Illinois

Figure skating career
- Country: United States
- Coach: Barbara Kossowska
- Skating club: FSC of Rockford

Medal record
World Junior Championships
Bronze medal – third place	1992 Quebec	Singles

Damon Allen is an American former competitive figure skater who currently works as a coach and choreographer. He is the 1992 World Junior bronze medalist and a two-time Winter Universiade silver medalist. In July 2014, he married Enrique Viveros in Santa Fe, New Mexico.

Allen currently coaches at the World Arena Ice Hall in Colorado Springs, Colorado.

His current students include:

- (United States) Amber Glenn
- (United States) Elyce Lin-Gracey
- (Hong Kong) Yuen Lap Kan
- (Thailand) Phattaratida Kaneshige
- (Spain) Emilia Murdock
- (Belgium) Nina Pinzarrone

His former students include:

- (United States) Joshua Farris
- (Canada) Liam Firus
- (United States) Tomoki Hiwatashi

== Results ==
GP: Champions Series (Grand Prix)

International
Event	90–91	91–92	92–93	93–94	94–95	95–96	96–97	97–98	98–99	99–00
GP Trophée de France						4th				
NHK Trophy				8th						
Finlandia Trophy									3rd	
Schäfer Memorial			3rd				3rd			
Winter Universiade			2nd		2nd					
International: Junior
World Junior Champ.		3rd								
National
U.S. Championships	1st J	10th	7th	9th	4th		5th		6th	6th
J = Junior
