= Cranberry Cup International =

International figure skating competition

- Status: Active
- Genre: ISU Challenger Series
- Frequency: Annual
- Venue: Skating Club of Boston
- Location: Norwood, Massachusetts
- Country: United States
- Inaugurated: 2021
- Previous event: 2026 Cranberry Cup International
- Organizer: Skating Club of Boston & U.S. Figure Skating

The Cranberry Cup International is an annual figure skating competition sanctioned by the International Skating Union (ISU), organized and hosted by the Skating Club of Boston at their facility in Norwood, Massachusetts, in the United States. The competition debuted in 2021. In 2024, it became part of the Challenger Series. Medals are awarded in men's singles and women's singles at the senior and junior levels; when the event is part of the Challenger Series, skaters earn points towards the World Standings and Season's World Ranking based on their results.

== History ==
The inaugural edition of the Cranberry Cup International was held in 2021 at the Skating Club of Boston in Norwood, Massachusetts, in the United States. Vincent Zhou and Alysa Liu, both of the United States, won the men's and women's event, respectively. Evgenia Tarasova and Vladimir Morozov of Russia won the pairs event. The pairs event was only held in 2021; beginning in 2022, only the men's and women's events have been contested.

In 2024, the Cranberry Cup International was the first event of the ISU Challenger Series, a series of international figure skating competitions sanctioned by the International Skating Union (ISU) and organized by ISU member nations. The objective is to ensure consistent organization and structure within a series of international competitions linked together, providing opportunities for senior-level skaters to compete at the international level and also earn points towards the World Standings and Season's World Ranking. When an event is held as part of the Challenger Series, it must host at least three of the four disciplines (men's singles, women's singles, pair skating, and ice dance) and representatives from at least ten different ISU member nations. The minimum number of entrants required for each discipline is eight skaters each in men's singles and women's singles, five teams in pair skating, and six teams in ice dance. Each ISU member nation is eligible to enter up to three skaters or teams per discipline in each competition, although the U.S. Figure Skating may enter an unlimited number of entrants in their own event.

The Cranberry Cup International is held in conjunction with the John Nicks Pairs Challenge – the former hosts the men's and women's events, while the latter hosts the pairs event – and the two competitions constitute the U.S. Figure Skating's contribution to the Challenger Series. The Cranberry Cup International was again held in 2025 and 2026. Organizers called the 2025 Cranberry Cup International a "critical early stop on the road to the 2026 Olympic Winter Games". Doug Zeghibe, executive director of the Skating Club of Boston, stated that "an international event this early in the season [allowed] fans a glimpse of many of the programs and athletes that [would] shape this Olympic season".

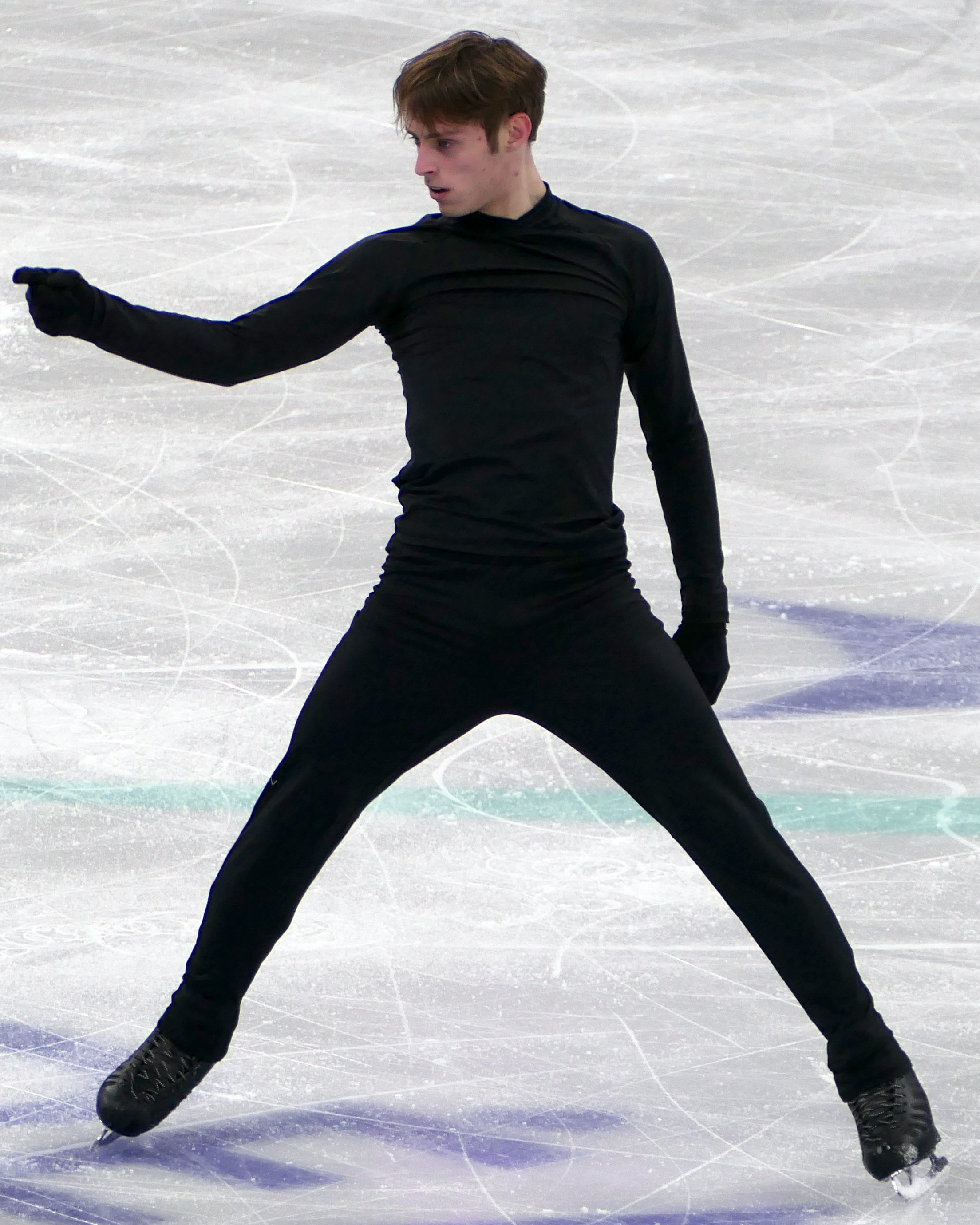
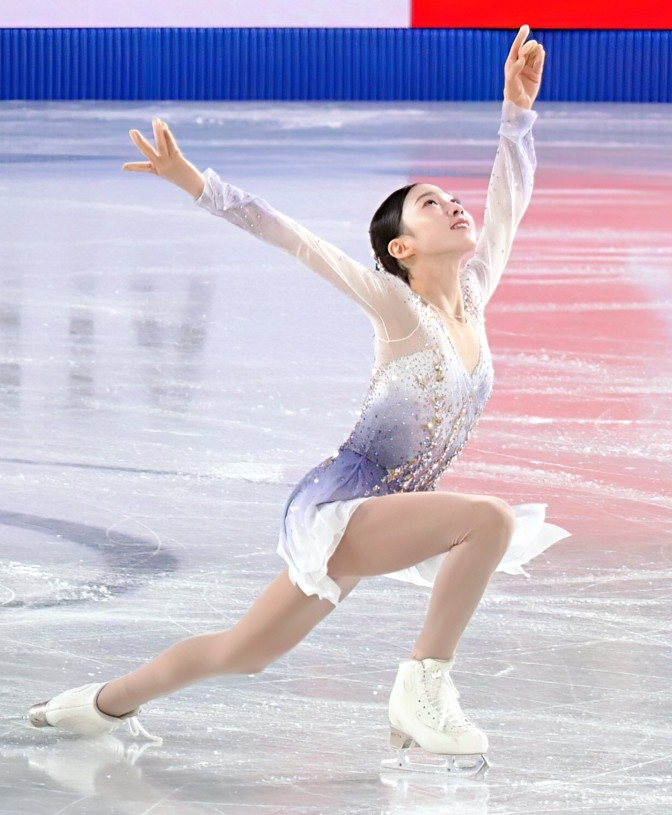
The 2026 Cranberry Cup International champions: Aleksandr Selevko of Estonia (men's singles) and Kim Yu-seong of South Korea (women's singles)

== Senior medalists ==
CS: Challenger Series event

=== Men's singles ===
Men's event medalists
Year	Gold	Silver	Bronze	Ref.
2021	(United States) Vincent Zhou	(United States) Jimmy Ma	(United States) Maxim Naumov	
2022	(Israel) Mark Gorodnitsky	(United States) Tomoki Hiwatashi	(United States) Eric Sjoberg	
2023	(Israel) Mark Gorodnitsky	(Canada) Wesley Chiu	(United States) Jimmy Ma	
2024 CS	(United States) Lucas Broussard	(France) Luc Economides	(United States) Jimmy Ma	
2025 CS	(Canada) Roman Sadovsky	(Estonia) Aleksandr Selevko	(Canada) Stephen Gogolev	
2026 CS	(Estonia) Aleksandr Selevko	(United States) Daniel Martynov	(Israel) Mark Gorodnitsky	

=== Women's singles ===
Women's event medalists
Year	Gold	Silver	Bronze	Ref.
2021	(United States) Alysa Liu	(South Korea) You Young	(United States) Mariah Bell	
2022	(United States) Audrey Shin	(United States) Sonja Hilmer	(United States) Amber Glenn	
2023	(United States) Lindsay Thorngren	(United States) Ava Marie Ziegler	(Canada) Kaiya Ruiter	
2024 CS	(United States) Sarah Everhardt	(United States) Elyce Lin-Gracey	(United States) Isabeau Levito	
2025 CS	(United States) Isabeau Levito	(Kazakhstan) Sofia Samodelkina	(South Korea) Shin Ji-a	
2026 CS	(South Korea) Kim Yu-seong	(South Korea) Kim Yu-jae	(United States) Logan Higase-Chen	

=== Pairs ===
Pairs event medalists
Year	Gold	Silver	Bronze	Ref.
2021	(Russia); Evgenia Tarasova; Vladimir Morozov	(United States); Alexa Knierim; Brandon Frazier	(United States); Jessica Calalang; Brian Johnson	

== Junior medalists ==
=== Men's singles ===
Junior men's event medalists
Year	Gold	Silver	Bronze	Ref.
2021	(United States) Matthew Nielsen	(United States) William Annis	(United States) Jacob Sanchez	
2022	(United States) Beck Strommer	(United States) Jacob Sanchez	(Canada) Alec Guinzbourg	
2023	(United States) Beck Strommer	(Canada) David Li	(United States) Aleksandr Fegan	
2024	(New Zealand) Yanhao Li	(United States) Jacob Sanchez	(Canada) Grayson Long	
2025	(New Zealand) Yanhao Li	(Canada) Grayson Long	(Canada) Anthony Paradis	
2026	(United States) Henry Gao	(Canada) Colton Moness	(Canada) Grayson Long	

=== Women's singles ===
Junior women's event medalists
Year	Gold	Silver	Bronze	Ref.
2021	(United States) Ava Marie Ziegler	(United States) Jessica Lin	(United States) Maryn Pierce	
2022	(Canada) Lia Pereira	(Thailand) Phattaratida Kaneshige	(United States) Phoebe Stubblefield	
2023	(United States) Katie Shen	(United States) Logan Higase-Chen	(United States) Josephine Lee	
2024	(United States) Emilia Nemirovsky	(United States) Logan Higase-Chen	(United States) Mia Kalin	
2025	(United States) Sophie Joline von Felten	(United States) Annika Chao	(United States) Kaya Tiernan	
2026	(Canada) Lia Cho	(United States) Kaya Tiernan	(United States) Emilia Nemirovsky	

== Cumulative medal count (senior medalists) ==
=== Men's singles ===
Total number of Cranberry Cup medals in men's singles by nation
Rank	Nation	Gold	Silver	Bronze	Total
1	United States	2	3	4	9
2	Israel	2	0	1	3
3	Canada	1	1	1	3
4	Estonia	1	1	0	2
5	France	0	1	0	1
Totals (5 entries)		6	6	6	18

=== Women's singles ===
Total number of Cranberry Cup medals in women's singles by nation
Rank	Nation	Gold	Silver	Bronze	Total
1	United States	5	3	4	12
2	South Korea	1	2	1	4
3	Kazakhstan	0	1	0	1
4	Canada	0	0	1	1
Totals (4 entries)		6	6	6	18

=== Total medals ===
This table includes one gold medal for Russia, and one silver medal and one bronze medal each for the United States, from the pairs competition in 2021.

Total number of Cranberry Cup medals by nation
Rank	Nation	Gold	Silver	Bronze	Total
1	United States	7	7	9	23
2	Israel	2	0	1	3
3	South Korea	1	2	1	4
4	Canada	1	1	2	4
5	Estonia	1	1	0	2
6	Russia	1	0	0	1
7	France	0	1	0	1
7	Kazakhstan	0	1	0	1
Totals (8 entries)		13	13	13	39
