= 1991 World Junior Figure Skating Championships =

- Type: ISU Championship
- Date: November 27 – December 2, 1990
- Season: 1990–91
- Location: Budapest, Hungary

Champions
- Men's singles: (Soviet Union) Vasili Eremenko
- Ladies' singles: (France) Surya Bonaly
- Pairs: (Soviet Union) Natalia Krestianinova / Alexei Torchinski
- Ice dance: (Soviet Union) Aliki Stergiadu / Juris Razgulajevs
- Previous: 1990 World Junior Championships
- Next: 1992 World Junior Championships

The 1991 World Junior Figure Skating Championships were held from November 27 to December 2, 1990 in Budapest, Hungary. The event was sanctioned by the International Skating Union and open to ISU member nations. Medals were awarded in the disciplines of men's singles, ladies' singles, pair skating, and ice dancing.

== Medal table ==
Rank	Nation	Gold	Silver	Bronze	Total
1	Soviet Union (URS)	3	2	1	6
2	France (FRA)	1	1	1	3
3	United States (USA)	0	1	1	2
4	China (CHN)	0	0	1	1
Totals (4 entries)		4	4	4	12

== Competition notes ==
Due to the large number of participants, the men and ladies had to qualify to participate in short program and free skating. Reunified in 1990, Germany had a special arrangement in number of participants based on the results of West Germany and East Germany in 1990.

== Results ==
=== Men ===
Rank	Name	Nation	TFP	SP	FS
1	Vasili Eremenko	Soviet Union	1.5	1	1
2	Alexander Abt	Soviet Union	4.0	2	3
3	Nicolas Pétorin	France			
4	Scott Davis	United States			
5	Philippe Candeloro	France			
6	Evgeni Pliuta	Soviet Union			
7	Fumihiro Oikawa	Japan			
8	Jan Kannegießer	Germany			
9	Ryan Hunka	United States			
10	John Baldwin Jr.	United States			
11	Luiz Mariano Taifas	Romania			
12	Gaku Aiyoshi	Japan			
13	Matthew Powers	Canada	20.5	11	15
14	Gilberto Viadana	Italy			
15	Mirko Müller	Germany			
16	An Yong-il	North Korea			
17	Michael Tyllesen	Denmark			
18	Lance Vipond	Canada	26.0	16	18
19	Li Xiaodong	China			
20	Eran Sragowicz	Germany			
did not advance to free skate
	Clive Shorten	United Kingdom			
	Robert Grzegorczyk	Poland			
	Stuart Bell	United Kingdom			
	Rastislav Vnučko	Czechoslovakia			
	Markus Leminen	Finland			
	Adam Hart	Australia			
	Kim Se-yol	South Korea			
	Luka Klasinc	Yugoslavia			
	Balázs Grencsér	Hungary			
	Ivan Dinev	Bulgaria			
	Sergio Canovas	Spain			

=== Ladies ===
Rank	Name	Nation	TFP	SP	FS
1	Surya Bonaly	France	1.5	1	1
2	Lisa Ervin	United States	4.0	2	3
3	Chen Lu	China	5.5	7	2
4	Nicole Bobek	United States			
5	Lenka Kulovaná	Czechoslovakia			
6	Laëtitia Hubert	France			
7	Yulia Potapova	Soviet Union			
8	Susanne Mildenberger	Germany			
9	Sabrina Tschudi	Switzerland			
10	Julia Vorobieva	Soviet Union			
11	Yukiko Kawasaki	Japan			
12	Claudia Unger	Germany			
13	Katja Günther	Germany			
14	Rena Inoue	Japan			
15	Zuzanna Szwed	Poland			
16	Mary Angela Larmer Wilson	Canada	22.5	13	16
17	Sharon Coulson	United Kingdom			
18	Sandra Garde	France			
19	Emilia Nagy	Hungary			
20	Lee Eun-hee	South Korea			
did not advance to free skate
	Melita Juratek	Yugoslavia			
	Kaisa Kella	Finland			
	Cathrin Degler	West Germany			
	Miriam Manzano	Australia			
	Tsvetelina Abrasheva	Bulgaria			
	Mari Kobayashi	Japan			
	Melanie Friedreich	Austria			
	Isabelle Balhan	Belgium			
	Linda Wallmark	Sweden			
	Monique van der Velden	Netherlands			
	Lee Gyong-ok	North Korea			
	Alexandra Stamataki	Greece			
	Sarah Badiani	Italy			
	Debbie Klestadt	Luxembourg			
	Marta Senra	Spain			
	Mayda Navarro	Mexico			

=== Pairs ===
Rank	Name	Nation	TFP	SP	FS
1	Natalia Krestianinova / Alexei Torchinski	Soviet Union		1	1
2	Svetlana Pristav / Viacheslav Tkachenko	Soviet Union			
3	Jennifer Heurlin / John Frederiksen	United States			
4	Oksana Kazakova / Andrei Mokhov	Soviet Union			
5	Aimee Offner / Brian Helgenberg	United States			
6	Nicole Sciarrotta / Gregory Sciarrotta Jr.	United States			
7	Caroline Haddad / Jean-Sébastien Fecteau	Canada		6	7
8	Allison Gaylor / John Robinson	Canada		8	8
9	Patricia Cardoso / Jean Francois Cote	Canada		9	9
10	Beata Szymłowska / Mariusz Siudek	Poland			
11	Xie Maomao / Zhao Hongbo	China			
12	Jasmin Schützenmeister / Jan Grüske-Weißenbach	Germany			
13	Go Ok-ran / Kim Gwang-ho	North Korea			
14	Victoria Pearce / Clive Shorten	United Kingdom			
15	Leslie Monod / Cédric Monod	Switzerland			
16	Silvia Martina / Claudio Fico	Italy			

=== Ice dancing ===
Rank	Name	Nation	TFP	C1	C2	OD	FD
1	Aliki Stergiadu / Juris Razgulajevs	Soviet Union		1	2	1	1
2	Marina Morel / Gwendal Peizerat	France		2	1	2	2
3	Elena Kustarova / Sergei Romashkin	Soviet Union					
4	Marina Anissina / Ilia Averbukh	Soviet Union					
5	Marie-France Dubreuil / Bruno Yvars	Canada		5	4	5	5
6	Virginie Vuillemin / Rémi Jacquemard	France					
7	Martine Patenaude / Eric Massé	Canada		6	6	6	7
8	Amélie Dion / Alexandre Alain	Canada		8	8	8	8
9	Kimberley Callahan / Robert Paul	United States					
10	Barbara Fusar-Poli / Matteo Bonfa	Italy					
11	Viera Poráčová / Pavol Poráč	Czechoslovakia					
12	Agnieszka Domańska / Marcin Głowacki	Poland					
13	Noémi Vedres / Endre Szentirmai	Hungary					
14	Laurie Baker / David Kastan	United States					
15	Kati Winkler / René Lohse	Germany					
16	Daria-Larissa Maritczak / Ihor-Andrij Maritczak	Austria					
17	Lisa Sheehan / Lachlan Coombe	United Kingdom					
18	Sylvia Rau / Alexander Dworak	Germany					
19	Sylwia Nowak / Sebastian Kolasiński	Poland					
20	Ryn Aun-ae / Kim Young-ho	North Korea					
