= 1993 World Figure Skating Championships =

Annual figure skating competition held in 1993

- Type: ISU Championship
- Date: March 9 – 14
- Season: 1992–93
- Location: Prague, Czech Republic
- Venue: Sportovní hala

Champions
- Men's singles: (Canada) Kurt Browning
- Ladies' singles: (Ukraine) Oksana Baiul
- Pairs: (Canada) Isabelle Brasseur / Lloyd Eisler
- Ice dance: (Russia) Maya Usova / Alexander Zhulin
- Previous: 1992 World Championships
- Next: 1994 World Championships

The 1993 World Figure Skating Championships were held in Prague (Sportovní hala), Czech Republic in March 1993. Medals were awarded in men's singles, ladies' singles, pair skating, and ice dancing.

1993 was the first year that the ISU introduced a qualifying round for the singles events. In the qualifying events, the skaters were split into two groups, with the top 12 in each group advancing to the short program.

== Medal tables ==
=== Medalists ===
Discipline	Gold	Silver	Bronze
Men	(Canada) Kurt Browning	(Canada) Elvis Stojko	(Russia) Alexei Urmanov
Ladies	(Ukraine) Oksana Baiul	(France) Surya Bonaly	(China) Chen Lu
Pair skating	(Canada) Isabelle Brasseur / Lloyd Eisler	(Germany) Mandy Wötzel / Ingo Steuer	(Russia) Evgenia Shishkova / Vadim Naumov
Ice dancing	(Russia) Maya Usova / Alexander Zhulin	(Russia) Oksana Grishuk / Evgeni Platov	(Russia) Anjelika Krylova / Vladimir Fedorov

=== Medals by country ===
Rank	Nation	Gold	Silver	Bronze	Total
1	Canada (CAN)	2	1	0	3
2	Russia (RUS)	1	1	3	5
3	Ukraine (UKR)	1	0	0	1
4	France (FRA)	0	1	0	1
4	Germany (GER)	0	1	0	1
6	China (CHN)	0	0	1	1
Totals (6 entries)		4	4	4	12

== Results ==
=== Men ===
Rank	Name	Nation	TFP	QA	QB	SP	FS
1	Kurt Browning	Canada	1.5	1		1	1
2	Elvis Stojko	Canada	4.5		1	5	2
3	Alexei Urmanov	Russia	4.5		2	3	3
4	Mark Mitchell	United States	6.0	3		2	5
5	Philippe Candeloro	France	8.0	2		8	4
6	Scott Davis	United States	9.5	4		7	6
7	Éric Millot	France	10.0		3	4	8
8	Masakazu Kagiyama	Japan	11.5	9		9	7
9	Cornel Gheorghe	Romania	16.0		5	14	9
10	Marcus Christensen	Canada	17.0	8		12	11
11	Oleg Tataurov	Russia	17.0		9	6	14
12	Dmitri Dmitrenko	Ukraine	19.0	5		18	10
13	Konstantin Kostin	Latvia	19.5	6		15	12
14	Igor Pashkevich	Russia	21.0	7		16	13
15	Ronny Winkler	Germany	21.0		6	10	16
16	Oula Jääskeläinen	Finland	22.5		8	11	17
17	Michael Tyllesen	Denmark	23.5		7	17	15
18	Steven Cousins	United Kingdom	24.5		4	13	18
19	Michael Shmerkin	Israel	29.5	12		21	19
20	Jung Sung-il	South Korea	30.0		12	20	20
21	Liu Yueming	China	30.5	10		19	21
22	Jaroslav Suchý	Czech Republic	34.0		11	24	22
23	Jan Erik Digernes	Norway	34.5	11		23	23
24	Alexander Murashko	Belarus	35.0		10	22	24
Short program not reached
25	Rastislav Vnučko	Slovakia		13			
25	Stephen Carr	Australia			13		
27	Roman Martõnenko	Estonia		14			
27	Dino Quattrocecere	South Africa			14		
29	Robert Grzegorczyk	Poland		15			
29	Fabrizio Garattoni	Italy			15		
31	Szabolcs Vidrai	Hungary		16			
31	David Liu	Chinese Taipei			16		
33	Nicolas Binz	Switzerland		17			
33	Daniel Feinado	Spain			17		
35	Jan Čejvan	Slovenia		18			
35	Florian Tuma	Austria			18		
37	Marcus Deen	Netherlands		19			
37	Besarion Tsintsadze	Georgia			19		
39	Sergei Umirov	Kazakhstan		20			
39	Tomislav Čižmešija	Croatia			20		
41	Christopher Blong	New Zealand		21			
41	Emanuele Ancorini	Sweden			21		
43	Harris Haita	Greece		22			
43	Ivan Dinev	Bulgaria			22		

=== Ladies ===
Rank	Name	Nation	TFP	QA	QB	SP	FS
1	Oksana Baiul	Ukraine	2.0		2	2	1
2	Surya Bonaly	France	3.5	1		3	2
3	Chen Lu	China	5.5		1	5	3
4	Yuka Sato	Japan	7.0	5		6	4
5	Nancy Kerrigan	United States	9.5	2		1	9
6	Marina Kielmann	Germany	10.0		3	10	5
7	Tanja Szewczenko	Germany	10.0		5	8	6
8	Karen Preston	Canada	10.5		4	7	7
9	Josée Chouinard	Canada	12.0	4		4	10
10	Lenka Kulovaná	Czech Republic	13.5		9	11	8
11	Marie-Pierre Leray	France	16.5		7	9	12
12	Charlene von Saher	United Kingdom	17.5	6		17	11
13	Lisa Ervin	United States	20.0	9		14	13
14	Zuzanna Szwed	Poland	20.5		10	13	14
15	Krisztina Czakó	Hungary	22.0	8		12	16
16	Zhang Bo	China	24.0		6	18	15
17	Viktoria Dimitrova	Bulgaria	24.5	7		15	17
18	Mila Kajas	Finland	26.0	3		16	18
19	Nathalie Krieg	Switzerland	29.0		11	20	19
20	Anisette Torp-Lind	Denmark	29.5		12	19	20
21	Cristina Mauri	Italy	32.0	12		22	21
22	Marta Andrade	Spain	32.5	11		23	22
23	Liu Xin	China	35.0	10		24	23
WD	Alice Sue Claeys	Belgium			8	21	
Short program not reached
25	Olga Vassilieva	Estonia		13			
25	Junko Yaginuma	Japan			13		
27	Tamara Heggen	Australia		14			
27	Lily Lyoonjung Lee	South Korea			14		
29	Joanna Ng	Chinese Taipei		15			
29	Maria Butyrskaya	Russia			15		
31	Mojca Kopač	Slovenia		16			
31	Tonia Kwiatkowski	United States			16		
33	Anne-Marie Soderholm	Sweden		17			
33	Melita Juratek	Croatia			17		
35	Andrea Kus	Austria		18			
35	Monique van der Velden	Netherlands			18		
37	Tatiana Malinina	Uzbekistan		19			
37	Alma Lepina	Latvia			19		
39	Marianne Aarnes	Norway		20			
39	Lauryna Slavinskaite	Lithuania			20		
41	Sandra Brajdic	Croatia		21			
41	Inna Ovsiannikova	Belarus			21		
43	Mayda Navarro	Mexico		22			
43	Rosanna Blong	New Zealand			22		
45	Jalina Kakadyl	Kazakhstan		23			
45	Kim Harris	South Africa			23		

=== Pairs ===
Rank	Name	Nation	TFP	SP	FS
1	Isabelle Brasseur / Lloyd Eisler	Canada	1.5	1	1
2	Mandy Wötzel / Ingo Steuer	Germany	3.5	3	2
3	Evgenia Shishkova / Vadim Naumov	Russia	4.0	2	3
4	Radka Kovaříková / René Novotný	Czech Republic	7.0	6	4
5	Jenni Meno / Todd Sand	United States	7.0	4	5
6	Marina Eltsova / Andrei Bushkov	Russia	9.5	5	7
7	Michelle Menzies / Jean-Michel Bombardier	Canada	10.0	8	6
8	Calla Urbanski / Rocky Marval	United States	11.5	7	8
9	Leslie Monod / Cédric Monod	Switzerland	14.5	9	10
10	Jodeyne Higgins / Sean Rice	Canada	15.5	13	9
11	Danielle Carr / Stephen Carr	Australia	17.0	12	11
12	Peggy Schwarz / Alexander König	Germany	17.0	10	12
13	Svetlana Pristav / Viacheslav Tkachenko	Ukraine	19.5	11	14
14	Elena Berezhnaya / Oleg Shliakhov	Latvia	20.5	15	13
15	Oksana Kazakova / Dmitri Sukhanov	Russia	22.0	14	15
16	Jackie Soames / John Jenkins	United Kingdom	25.0	18	16
17	Beata Zielińska / Mariusz Siudek	Poland	26.5	19	17
18	Elena Grigoreva / Sergei Sheiko	Belarus	26.5	17	18
19	Sarah Abitbol / Stéphane Bernadis	France	27.0	16	19
20	Claire Auret / Christoff van Rensburg	South Africa	30.5	21	20
WD	Elaine Asanakis / Mark Alan Naylor	Greece		20	

=== Ice dancing ===
Rank	Name	Nation	TFP	CD1	CD2	OD	FD
1	Maya Usova / Alexander Zhulin	Russia	2.0	1	1	1	1
2	Oksana Grishuk / Evgeni Platov	Russia	4.0	2	2	2	2
3	Anjelika Krylova / Vladimir Fedorov	Russia	6.2	4	3	3	3
4	Susanna Rahkamo / Petri Kokko	Finland	7.8	3	4	4	4
5	Sophie Moniotte / Pascal Lavanchy	France	10.4	6	6	5	5
6	Stefania Calegari / Pasquale Camerlengo	Italy	12.6	5	5	6	7
7	Irina Romanova / Igor Yaroshenko	Ukraine	13.0	7	7	7	6
8	Kateřina Mrázová / Martin Šimeček	Czech Republic	16.0	8	8	8	8
9	Tatiana Navka / Samvel Gezalian	Belarus	19.0	10	10	10	9
10	Aliki Stergiadu / Juris Razgulajevs	Uzbekistan	20.0	9	9	9	11
11	Renée Roca / Gorsha Sur	United States	21.0	11	11	11	10
12	Jennifer Goolsbee / Hendryk Schamberger	Germany	24.0	12	12	12	12
13	Margarita Drobiazko / Povilas Vanagas	Lithuania	27.4	14	14	13	14
14	Shae-Lynn Bourne / Victor Kraatz	Canada	28.6	15	15	16	13
15	Susie Wynne / Russ Witherby	United States	28.6	13	13	14	15
16	Irina Le Bed / Alexandre Piton	France	33.8	15	16	16	18
17	Marika Humphreys / Justin Lanning	United Kingdom	34.2	19	18	18	16
18	Regina Woodward / Csaba Szentpétery	Hungary	35.8	18	19	19	17
19	Elizaveta Stekolnikova / Dmitri Kazarlyga	Kazakhstan	36.0	17	17	17	19
20	Radmila Chroboková / Milan Brzý	Czech Republic	40.0	20	20	20	20
21	Agnieszka Domańska / Marcin Głowacki	Poland	42.2	22	21	21	21
22	Barbara Fusar-Poli / Alberto Reani	Italy	43.8	21	22	22	22
23	Angelika Führing / Peter Wilczek	Austria	46.4	24	24	23	23
24	Diane Gerencser / Alexander Stanislavov	Switzerland	47.6	23	23	24	24
Free dance not reached
25	Kayo Shirahata / Hiroshi Tanaka	Japan		25	25	25	
26	Albena Denkova / Hristo Nikolov	Bulgaria		26	26	26	
27	Jelena Trocenko / Erik Samovich	Latvia		28	27	27	
28	Tamara Ruby / Konstantin Kaplan	Israel		27	28	28	
29	Richelle van der Riet / Nestor van Eeden	South Africa		29	29	29	
