= Tsvetelina Abrasheva =

Bulgarian competitive figure skater (born 1977)

Personal information
- Born: 27 May 1977 (age 49) Sofia, Bulgaria
- Height: 1.67 m (5 ft 5 1/2 in)

Figure skating career
- Country: Bulgaria
- Retired: 1997

Tsvetelina Abrasheva (Bulgarian: Цветелина Абрашева; born 27 May 1977) is a Bulgarian former competitive figure skater who competed at the 1994 Winter Olympics and is the 1996 Ondrej Nepela Memorial silver medalist. She now works as a sports journalist for Bulgarian National Television.

== Biography ==
Abrasheva started skating at age three. She admired fellow figure skater Katarina Witt. As a junior, she competed at the 1991 World Junior Championships, where she placed 25th and did not reach the free skate.

In 1994, she represented Bulgaria at the 1994 Winter Olympics. Her main goal was to qualify for the free skate, which she did after placing 21st in the short program. She finished 24th overall.

She enrolled in the National Sports Academy "Vasil Levski" to study coaching, sports management, and sports journalism, and she graduated with a master's degree. In 1995, she competed at the 1995 Winter Universiade, where she placed 12th. She won the silver medal at the Nepela Memorial in 1996 behind Svetlana Bukareva.

Abrasheva planned to continue skating and attempt to qualify for the 1998 Winter Olympics. However, she tore the cruciate ligaments of her knee. She spent six months recovering and returned to training, but she suffered a second injury six months later, after which she retired from competing.

Abrasheva married a journalist who played hockey around 2000 and had a son two years later. She initially worked in radio. After the birth of her son, she started to work for Bulgarian National Television around 2002 and began commentating on Olympic events in 2006.

== Results ==
International
Event	90–91	93–94	94–95	95–96	96–97	97–98
Winter Olympics		24th				
European Champ.		29th				
Karl Schäfer			12th		10th	
Ondrej Nepela					2nd	5th
International: Junior
World Junior Champ.	25th					
National
Bulgarian Champ.						
