= Vasili Eremenko =

Ukrainian figure skater

Personal information
- Native name: Василь Єременко
- Full name: Vasyl Yeremenko
- Other names: Russian: Василий Еременко; Vasili/Vassily Eremenko
- Born: 10 May 1973 (age 53) Odesa, Ukrainian SSR, Soviet Union
- Home town: Odesa, Ukraine
- Height: 1.70 m (5 ft 7 in)

Figure skating career
- Country: Ukraine (1992–95); Soviet Union (1989–92)
- Discipline: Men's singles
- Began skating: 1977
- Retired: 1995

Medal record
Representing Ukraine
Ukrainian Championships
Silver medal – second place	1994 Kyiv	Singles
Bronze medal – third place	1995 Kyiv	Singles
Representing Soviet Union
World Junior Championships
Gold medal – first place	1991 Budapest	Singles

Vasyl Yeremenko (Ukrainian: Василь Єременко, Russian: Василий Еременко: Vasili/Vassily Eremenko, born 10 May 1973) is a Ukrainian former competitive figure skater. He is the 1991 World Junior champion and 1991 Skate Canada International silver medalist for the Soviet Union. In 1992, he began representing Ukraine. Valentyn Nikolayev and Georgy Starkov coached him in Odesa.

== Results ==
International
Event	89–90 (URS)	90–91 (URS)	91–92 (URS)	92–93 (UKR)	93–94 (UKR)	94–95 (UKR)
World Champ.						13th
European Champ.						9th
NHK Trophy				WD		
Skate America	8th					
Skate Canada			2nd			
Trophée de France						6th
Sofia Cup					4th	
Ukrainian Souvenir						3rd
International: Junior
World Junior Champ.		1st				
National
Ukrainian Champ.					2nd	3rd
WD: Withdrew
