= Aliki Stergiadu =

Uzbek-Latvian ice dancer (born 1972)

Personal information
- Born: 5 October 1972 (age 54) Tashkent, Uzbek SSR, Soviet Union
- Height: 1.67 m (5 ft 5 1/2 in)

Figure skating career
- Country: Uzbekistan (1992–1994); Latvia (1991–1992 season); Soviet Union (1990–1991 season)
- Discipline: Ice dance
- Partner: Juris Razgulajevs
- Retired: 1994

Aliki Stergiadu (born 5 October 1972) is a former competitive ice dancer from Uzbekistan. She is the 1991 World Junior champion with Juris Razgulajevs for Latvia. She now works as a coach and technical specialist in Sweden.

== Personal life ==
Stergiadu was born on 5 October 1972 in Tashkent, Uzbek SSR, Soviet Union to Russian parents. She lived in Elektrostal, Russia until she took a coaching position in Skellefteå, Sweden in 2006. She married Lennart "Lelle" Erinder in September 2012 in Skellefteå, with whom she has a child; they had their ceremony on an ice rink.

== Career ==
Stergiadu began skating at age five. Early in her career, she competed for the Soviet Union with Juris Razgulajevs. Coached by Natalia Linichuk in Moscow, they won the 1991 World Junior Championships in Budapest, Hungary.

Stergiadu/Razgulajevs moved up to the senior level in the 1991–92 season. With the Soviet Union having dissolved, they decided to compete for Latvia. They placed tenth at the 1992 World Championships in Oakland, California.

In the 1992–93 season, Stergiadu/Razgulajevs began representing Uzbekistan. They won a silver medal at the 1992 Piruetten in Hamar, skating to West Side Story, and finished tenth at the 1993 World Championships in Prague.

They won the bronze emdal at the 1993 NHK Trophy in Chiba, Japan. In February 1994, they competed at the Winter Olympics in Lillehammer and finished 13th. Their last competition together was the 1994 World Championships in Chiba, where they placed 11th.

== Post-competitive career ==
Stergiadu studied for five years at the Moscow State Academy of Physical Culture and became a coach for both ice dance and single skating.

She began coaching in Skellefteå, Sweden in 2006. Initially given a four-month contract, she stayed and became the head coach. She resigned at the end of 2013 for personal reasons. She is also an international technical specialist in ice dancing for Sweden.

== Results ==
(with Razgulajevs for the Soviet Union, Latvia and Uzbekistan)

International
Event	1990–91 (URS)	1991–92 (LAT)	1992–93 (UZB)	1993–94 (UZB)
Winter Olympics				13th
World Championships		10th	10th	11th
NHK Trophy				3rd
Piruetten			2nd	
International: Junior
World Junior Champ.	1st			
