= Juris Razgulajevs =

Canadian ice dancer and coach (born 1973)

Japanese name
- Kana: ユーリス・ラザグリアエフ

Russian name
- Russian: Юрий Разгуляев

Juris Razgulajevs
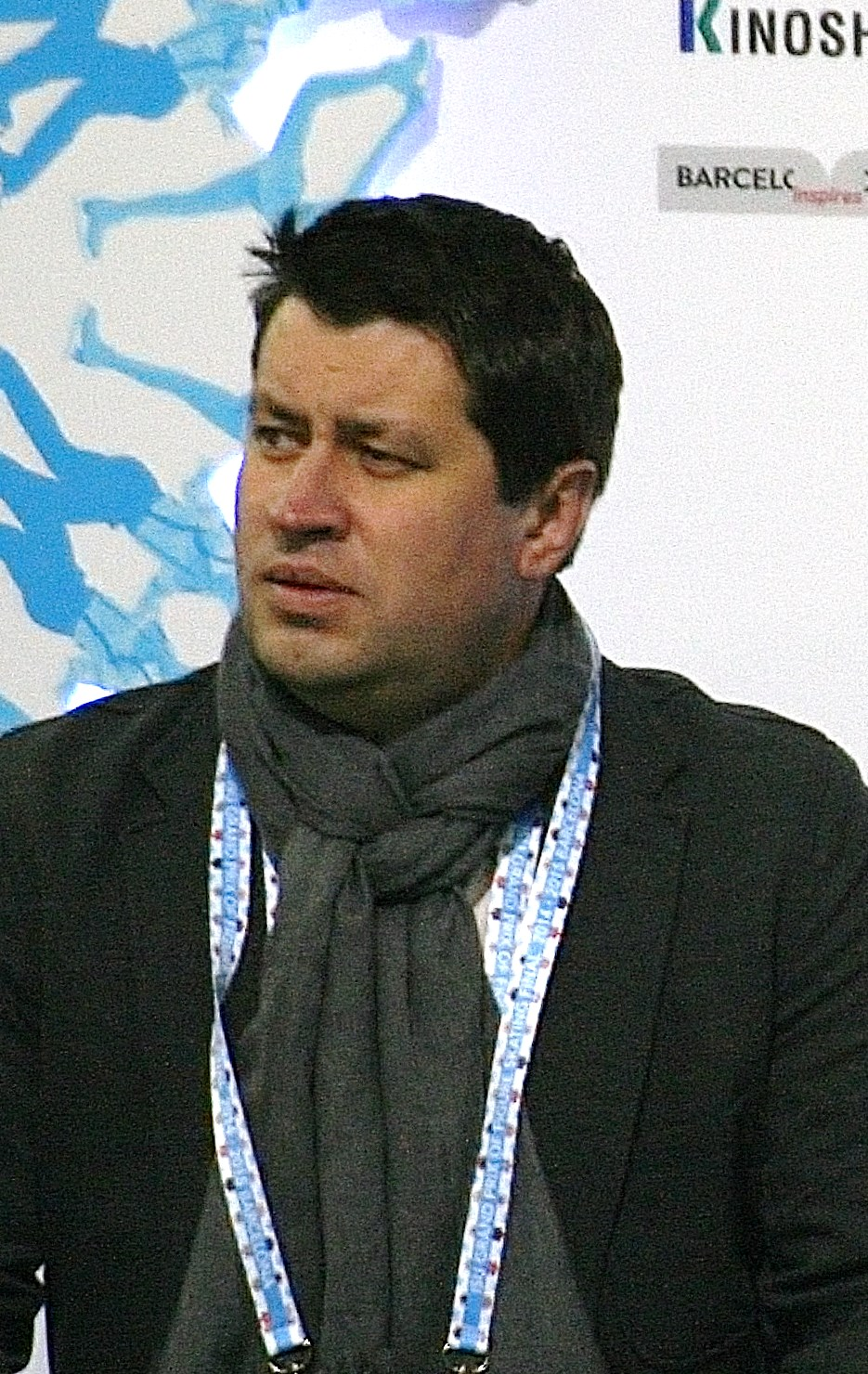
- Razgulajevs in 2014

Personal information
- Born: March 20, 1973 (age 53) Riga, Latvian SSR, Soviet Union
- Height: 1.75 m (5 ft 9 in)

Figure skating career
- Country: Latvia; Japan; Uzbekistan; Soviet Union
- Retired: 1997

Juris Razgulajevs, sometimes spelled Yuri Razguliaiev, (born March 20, 1973) is a Canadian ice dancing coach and former competitor who represented the Soviet Union, Latvia, Uzbekistan, and Japan. He is the 1991 World Junior champion with partner Aliki Stergiadu for the Soviet Union.

== Personal life ==
Razgulajevs was born on March 20, 1973, in Riga, Latvia. He moved to the United States in 1995 and then to Canada in 1999. His wife is named Irina. Their son, Dmitre Razgulajevs, was born on November 19, 1996, in Boston and competes in ice dancing for Canada. Their second son, Alexie, was born in 2000 and plays basketball.

== Career ==
=== Partnership with Stergiadu ===
Early in his career, Razgulajevs competed with Aliki Stergiadu for the Soviet Union. Coached by Natalia Linichuk in Moscow, they won the 1991 World Junior Championships in Budapest, Hungary.

Stergiadu/Razgulajevs moved up to the senior level in the 1991–92 season. The Soviet Union having dissolved, they decided to compete for Latvia. They placed tenth at the 1992 World Championships in Oakland, California.

In the 1992–93 season, Stergiadu/Razgulajevs began representing Uzbekistan. They won a silver medal at the 1992 Piruetten in Hamar and finished tenth at the 1993 World Championships in Prague.

They were awarded bronze at the 1993 NHK Trophy in Chiba, Japan. In February 1994, Stergiadu/Razgulajevs competed at the Winter Olympics in Lillehammer and finished 13th. Their last competition together was the 1994 World Championships in Chiba, where they placed 11th.

=== Later career ===
In 1995, Razgulajevs relocated with Linichuk's group to the United States. He teamed up with Nakako Tsuzuki to compete for Japan. They were coached by Natalia Dubova in Lake Placid, New York. They were two-time Japanese national champions and placed 16th at the 1996 World Championships. They parted ways at the end of the season.

His next partner was Jenny Dahlen, with whom he competed for Latvia. They placed 24th at the 1997 World Championships and 22nd at the 1997 European Championships.

Razgulajevs retired from competitive skating in 1997. He became an Assistant Director, coach and choreographer at the Scarboro Figure Skating Club in Ontario, Canada.

Skaters who Razgulajevs has coached include:

- (Canada) Piper Gilles / Paul Poirier
- (Canada) Molly Lanaghan / Dmitre Razgulajevs
- (Republic of Ireland) Carolane Soucisse / Shane Firus
- (Canada) Nadiia Bashynska / Peter Beaumont

As a choreographer, he has worked with:

- (Canada) Paige Lawrence / Rudi Swiegers
- (Canada) Brooke McIntosh / Benjamin Mimar
- (United States) Ilia Malinin
- (Canada) Madeline Schizas

== Results ==
=== With Stergiadu for the Soviet Union, Latvia and Uzbekistan ===
International
Event	1990–91 (URS)	1991–92 (LAT)	1992–93 (UZB)	1993–94 (UZB)
Winter Olympics				13th
World Championships		10th	10th	11th
NHK Trophy				3rd
Piruetten			2nd	
International: Junior
World Junior Champ.	1st			

=== With Tsuzuki for Japan ===
Event	1995–96
World Championships	16th

=== With Dahlen for Latvia ===
Event	1996–97
World Championships	24th
European Championships	22nd
Trophy of the Polish FSA	7th
