= Ihor-Andrij Maritczak =

Austrian former ice dancer (born 1973)

Personal information
- Born: 17 February 1973 (age 53) Vienna, Austria

Figure skating career
- Country: Austria
- Partner: Daria-Larissa Maritczak
- Retired: 1992

Ihor-Andrij Maritczak (born 17 February 1973 in Vienna) is an Austrian former ice dancer. With Daria-Larissa Maritczak, he became a two-time Austrian national champion. They competed at five ISU Championships, including the 1991 World Championships in Munich, Germany, and 1992 European Championships in Lausanne, Switzerland. Their best result, 12th, came at the 1992 World Junior Championships in Hull, Quebec, Canada.

As of 2017, Maritczak is working as a lawyer in Vienna.

== Competitive highlights ==
With Daria-Larissa Maritczak

International
Event	1989–90	1990–91	1991–92
World Championships		22nd	
European Championships			20th
World Junior Championships	17th	16th	12th
National
Austrian Championships		1st	1st
