= Daria-Larissa Maritczak =

Austrian former ice dancer (born 1970)

Personal information
- Born: 1970s

Figure skating career
- Country: Austria
- Partner: Ihor-Andrij Maritczak
- Retired: 1992

Daria-Larissa Maritczak is an Austrian former ice dancer. With Ihor-Andrij Maritczak, she became a two-time Austrian national champion. They competed at five ISU Championships, including the 1991 World Championships in Munich, Germany, and 1992 European Championships in Lausanne, Switzerland. Their best result, 12th, came at the 1992 World Junior Championships in Hull, Quebec, Canada.

As of 2017, Maritczak is working as an orthopedic surgeon in Vienna.

== Competitive highlights ==
With Ihor-Andrij Maritczak

International
Event	1989–90	1990–91	1991–92
World Championships		22nd	
European Championships			20th
World Junior Championships	17th	16th	12th
National
Austrian Championships		1st	1st
