= Zuzanna Szwed =

Polish figure skater

Personal information
- Born: 19 July 1977 (age 49) Warsaw, Poland
- Height: 1.55 m (5 ft 1 in)

Figure skating career
- Country: Poland
- Began skating: 1983
- Retired: 1998

Zuzanna Szwed (Polish pronunciation: [zuˈzanna ˈʂfɛd]; born 19 July 1977) is a Polish former competitive figure skater. She is the 1994 Karl Schäfer Memorial champion, 1995 Finlandia Trophy silver medalist, and a five-time Polish national champion. She competed at the 1992 Winter Olympics in Albertville.

== Personal life ==
Zuzanna Szwed was born on 19 July 1977 in Warsaw, Poland. She married American pair skater Aaron Parchem in Chicago in 2004. They have a daughter, Sofie (born c. 2011).

== Career ==
Szwed began skating in 1983 and was coached by Lucja Rylska early in her career. Making her first ISU Championship appearance, she placed 15th at the 1991 Junior Worlds in Budapest, Hungary.

Szwed competed at the 1992 Winter Olympics in Albertville, France. She qualified for the final segment by placing 23rd in the short program and went on to finish 19th overall. She was the first skater to represent Poland in ladies' single skating at the Olympics.

In the 1993–94 season, Szwed finished eighth at the World Junior Championships in Colorado Springs, Colorado and second at the Polish Championships, both times finishing behind Anna Rechnio, who was selected to compete at the 1994 Winter Olympics in Lillehammer.

In the 1994–95 season, Szwed won gold at the 1994 Karl Schäfer Memorial ahead of Krisztina Czakó and Maria Butyrskaya. Ranked 15th in the short and second in the free, she finished seventh overall at the 1995 World Junior Championships in Budapest.

In the 1997–98 season, Szwed took bronze at the Polish Championships behind Rechnio and Sabina Wojtala. She was coached by Craig Maurizi in Detroit.

In total, Szwed reached the free skate at thirteen ISU Championships – three Worlds, seven Europeans, and three Junior Worlds. She finished in the top ten at four Europeans and two Junior Worlds and in the top fourteen at two Worlds. She works as a coach and choreographer at the Detroit Skating Club in Bloomfield Hills, Michigan.

== Programs ==
Season	Short program	Free skating
1997–98		The Man I Love by George Gershwin, Boston Pops Orchestra

== Results ==
GP: Champions Series (Grand Prix)

International
Event	90–91	91–92	92–93	93–94	94–95	95–96	96–97	97–98
Winter Olympics		19th						
World Champ.	17th	28th	14th			25th	14th	
European Champ.	16th	10th	7th	14th	13th	7th	10th	
GP Cup of Russia							5th	
GP Trophée de France						7th		
GP Nations Cup								4th
GP Skate America							9th	
GP Skate Canada								4th
Finlandia Trophy						2nd		4th
Inter. de Paris			9th					
Skate Canada		10th						
Nebelhorn Trophy		17th			4th	7th		
Schäfer Memorial		15th			1st			
Skate America			9th	10th				
St. Gervais					4th			
International: Junior
World Junior Champ.	15h			8th	7th			
National
Polish Champ.	1st	1st	1st	2nd	1st	1st	2nd	3rd
