= Lisa Ervin =

American figure skater

Personal information
- Born: April 20, 1977 (age 49) Charleston, West Virginia, U.S.

Figure skating career
- Country: United States

Lisa Ervin (born April 20, 1977) is an American former figure skater. She won three consecutive silver medals at the World Junior Figure Skating Championships from 1991 to 1993 and is the 1993 US National silver medalist. She was coached by Carol Heiss Jenkins and originally trained by Melissa Smith at the Charleston Civic Center Ice Arena. Due to an eating disorder, she chose to retire from competitive skating. Her decision to stop skating is profiled in Christine Brennan's book Inside Edge: A Revealing Journey into the Secret World of Figure Skating.

Ervin worked as a coach and technical specialist. She served as the technical specialist during the ladies event at the 2007–2008 ISU Junior Grand Prix event in Lake Placid, New York, and during the ladies event at the 2006 Cup of China. She was the Assistant Technical Specialist at the men's event at the 2008 European Figure Skating Championships, and the men's event at the 2006 Cup of China.

She received her Bachelors of Liberal Arts from Hamilton College in 1999.

She coached in New York state. She divorced in 2012.

She remarried in 2018, but later filed for divorce in May 2023. She is currently the Research and Literacy Specialist at The Summit Center. She is completing her doctorate at The State University of New York at Buffalo, and is an adjunct professor. She has two children, Joseph and Sophia Baudo.

== Competitive highlights ==
Event	1990-91	1991-92	1992-93	1993-94
World Championships			13th	
World Junior Championships	2nd	2nd	2nd	
U.S. Championships		4th	2nd	7th
Olympics				
