= Mayda Navarro =

Mexican figure skater (born 1975)

Personal information
- Nationality: Mexican
- Born: 22 August 1975 (age 49)

Sport
- Sport: Figure skating

Mayda Navarro (born 22 August 1975) is a Mexican figure skater. She competed in the ladies' singles event at the 1992 Winter Olympics finishing in 29th place.
