= Evgenia Shishkova =

Russian pair skater and coach (1972–2025)

Personal information
- Native name: Евгения Васильевна Шишкова
- Full name: Evgenia Vasilievna Shishkova
- Born: 18 December 1972 Leningrad, Russian SFSR, Soviet Union
- Died: 29 January 2025 (aged 52) Washington, D.C., U.S.
- Cause of death: Mid-air collision
- Height: 4 ft 10 in (147 cm)

Figure skating career
- Country: Russia; CIS; Soviet Union
- Partner: Vadim Naumov
- Coach: Ludmila Velikova
- Retired: 1998
Medal record
Figure skating: Pairs
Representing Russia
World Championships
Gold medal – first place	1994 Chiba	Pairs
Silver medal – second place	1995 Birmingham	Pairs
Bronze medal – third place	1993 Prague	Pairs
European Championships
Bronze medal – third place	1995 Dortmund	Pairs
Silver medal – second place	1994 Copenhagen	Pairs
Bronze medal – third place	1993 Helsinki	Pairs
Grand Prix Final
Gold medal – first place	1995–1996 Paris	Pairs
Representing CIS
European Championships
Bronze medal – third place	1992 Lausanne	Pairs
Representing Soviet Union
European Championships
Bronze medal – third place	1991 Sofia	Pairs

Evgenia Vasilievna Shishkova (Russian: Евгения Васильевна Шишкова; 18 December 1972 – 29 January 2025) was a Russian figure skating coach and competitor. With her husband Vadim Naumov, she was the 1994 world champion and the 1995–96 Champions Series Final champion.

Shishkova died on 29 January 2025, when American Eagle Flight 5342 collided with a U.S. Army Sikorsky UH-60 Black Hawk helicopter while the jet was on approach to land at Ronald Reagan Washington National Airport.

== Career ==
Shishkova and Naumov were introduced in 1985 by Naumov's coach who wanted them to skate together. Naumov initially rebuffed the idea because he did not wish to change partners; however after several tryouts, he and Shishkova agreed to be a team. They landed a throw triple jump during their first training and began competing together in 1987.

In 1991 Shishkova/Naumov won the Soviet National Championships and captured bronze at their first European Championships in Sofia, Bulgaria, then placed 5th at the World Championships in Munich, Germany. During the next season, they competed at their first Olympics, the 1992 Winter Olympics in Albertville, France, placing fifth. Shishkova/Naumov won their first World Championships' medal–bronze–at the 1993 World Championships. The pair placed 4th at the 1994 Winter Olympics in Lillehammer, Norway. They just missed out on Olympic bronze, with 4 judges out of 5 placing them 3rd ahead of eventual bronze medal winners, the Canadians Brasseur & Eisler. People in the public whistled when the marks appeared on the jumbotron. The pair ended the season by becoming world champions in Chiba, Japan east of Tokyo on 23 March 1994.

Shishkova/Naumov won their third World Championships' medal, which was silver at the 1995 World Championships in Birmingham, England. Despite skating a clean free program, they lost to a flawed free skate by the eventual winners Kovarikova & Novotny. From 1991 to 1995, the pair also won five European Championships medals. After withdrawing from the 1996 European Championships due to a severe ear infection suffered by Evgenia, in February 1996 they won gold at the 1995–96 Champions Series Final (later renamed the Grand Prix Final) in Paris. At the 1996 World Championships in Edmonton, Alberta, Shishkova/Naumov were third after the short program. In the long program, four judges gave first-place votes to Marina Eltsova / Andrei Bushkov who finished as gold medalists. Four judges voted in favor of Shishkova/Naumov, however, low scores from the other five judges left them off the podium in 4th place.

Shishkova/Naumov missed most of the 1996/97 season following Naumov's collar bone injury that he suffered in the summer and early fall of 1996. They did not make the 1998 Winter Olympic team for Russia as they placed 4th at Russian Nationals' in December 1997. They decided to retire from ISU competition in 1998 and skate and turn professional. The pair won the World Professional Championships in Jaca, Spain, in April 1998. After skating professionally for about a year and a half, they transitioned into coaching, working at the International Skating Center in Simsbury, Connecticut northwest of Hartford. They moved and became coaches at the Skating Club of Boston in Norwood, Massachusetts west of Quincy, in February 2017.

== Personal life and death ==
Shishkova and Naumov married in Saint Petersburg, Russia, on 7 August 1995. They settled in Simsbury in 1998. Their son, Maxim Naumov, was born in August 2001 and competes in men's singles for the United States.

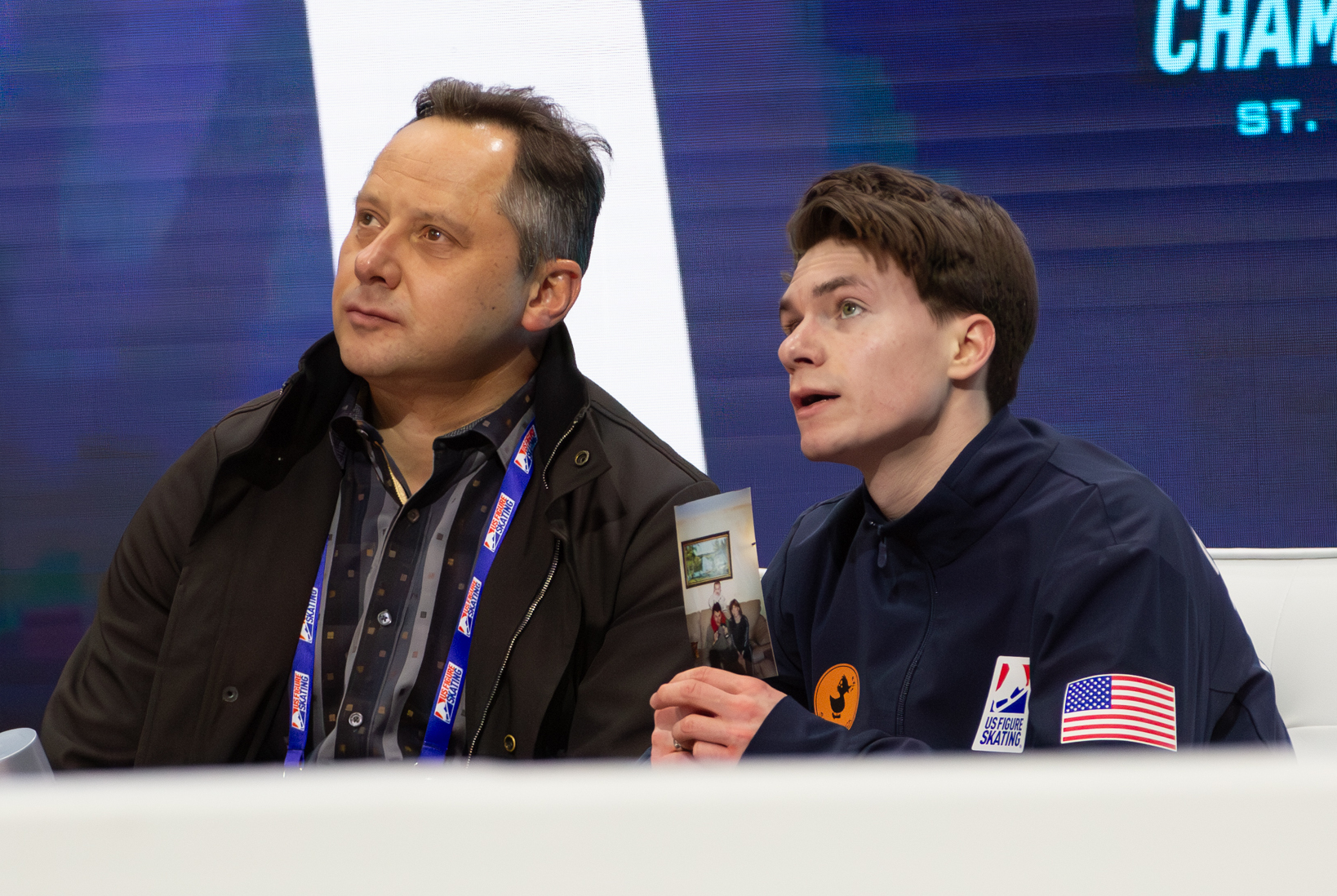
Shiskova and Naumov being honoured through their son, Maxim, holding a photo of them in the kiss and cry area at the 2026 U.S. Championships

On 29 January 2025, Naumov and Shishkova both died on American Eagle Flight 5342 that collided with an U.S. Army Sikorsky UH-60 Black Hawk helicopter while the jet was on approach to land at Ronald Reagan Washington National Airport. They were returning from Wichita, Kansas, where they participated in a development camp for young skaters, days following the 2025 U.S. Figure Skating Championships. The Skating Club of Boston, where the couple coached, had six skaters who died in the crash. Their son, Maxim, who had competed at the U.S. Championships, was not on board the plane, having flown out of Wichita Dwight D. Eisenhower National Airport two days before the crash took place. On March 2, 2025, U.S. Figure Skating held the ice show Legacy on Ice, which paid tribute to Shishkova and the other victims that were killed aboard American Eagle Flight 5342. Maxim performed to Shishkova and Naumov's favorite song, "Город, которого нет (The City That Doesn't Exist)" by Igor Kornelyuk, to honor his parents.

In January 2026, Maxim fulfilled his and his parents' dreams by making the 2026 Winter Olympic team. "I would not be sitting here without the unimaginable work, effort and love from my parents," said Naumov after being named to the team. "It means absolutely everything to me, fulfilling the dream that we collectively had as a family since I first was on the ice at five years old. So it means absolutely everything. And I know they’re looking down, smiling and proud."

== Programs ==
Season	Short program	Free skating	Exhibition
1998–99 (PRO)	Summer of '42 by Michel Legrand	Il trovatore by Giuseppe Verdi	Nocturne by Secret Garden; Summertime performed by Sublime; Estoy Loco (from Paulie OST) by John Debney
1997–98	Toccata and Fugue by Johann Sebastian Bach	Don Quixote by Ludwig Minkus	Ave Maria by Charles Gounod, Johann Sebastian Bach
1996–97	Ave Maria by Charles Gounod, Johann Sebastian Bach	Meditation (from Thaïs) by Jules Massenet	Act 1, No. 2 Cavatina: Largo al factotum from The Barber of Seville by Gioachino Rossini
1995–96	Ave Maria by Charles Gounod, Johann Sebastian Bach	Don Quixote by Ludwig Minkus	Act 1, No. 2 Cavatina: Largo al factotum from The Barber of Seville by Gioachino Rossini; Danse des petits cygnes from Swan Lake by Pyotr Ilyich Tchaikovsky
1994–95	Introduction and Rondo Capriccioso by Camille Saint-Saëns	Unfinished Symphony by Franz Schubert	Chi Mai by Ennio Morricone; Act 1, No. 2 Cavatina: Largo al factotum from The Barber of Seville by Gioachino Rossini
1993–94	Introduction and Rondo Capriccioso by Camille Saint-Saëns	Die Fledermaus by Johann Strauss II	Take Five performed by The Dave Brubeck Quartet; Flight of the Bumblebee by Nikolai Rimsky-Korsakov
1992–93	Colonel Bogey March by F. J. Ricketts	Die Fledermaus by Johann Strauss II	Slap That Bass by George Gershwin; The Entertainer by Scott Joplin; Nature Boy by Nat King Cole
1991–92	Take Five performed by The Dave Brubeck Quartet	Medley: La Festa Degli Angeli (Concerto No.3, RV 310) arranged by James Last composed by Antonio Vivaldi; Industrial Revolution, Pt. 1 by Jean-Michel Jarre	Old Fashion by Richard Clayderman; The Entertainer by Scott Joplin
1990–91	I Dub U performed by Freeez	Medley: La Festa Degli Angeli (Concerto No.3, RV 310) arranged by James Last composed by Antonio Vivaldi; Industrial Revolution, Pt. 1 by Jean-Michel Jarre	

== Competitive highlights ==
GP: Champions Series (Grand Prix)

With Naumov:

- Soviet Union (URS): Start of career through December 1991
- Commonwealth of Independent States (CIS): 1992 European and World Championships
- Unified Team at the Olympics (EUN): 1992 Olympics
- Russia (RUS): 1992–93 to end of career

International
Event	88–89	89–90	90–91	91–92	92–93	93–94	94–95	95–96	96–97	97–98
Winter Olympics				5th		4th				
World Champ.			5th	5th	3rd	1st	2nd	4th		
European Champ.			3rd	3rd	3rd	2nd	3rd	WD	5th	
GP Final								1st		5th
GP Cup of Russia										2nd
GP NHK Trophy								1st	2nd	
GP Skate America										3rd
GP Skate Canada								1st		
Centennial On Ice								1st		
Goodwill Games							3rd			
Inter. de Paris					1st					
Moscow News	5th									
Nations Cup				2nd		1st				
Nebelhorn Trophy		2nd								
NHK Trophy				1st	1st					
Skate America					3rd	1st	2nd			
Skate Canada			2nd							
National
Russian Champ.					WD	3rd		1st	3rd	4th
Soviet Champ.			1st	2nd						
