= Alexa Knierim =

American pair skater (born 1991)

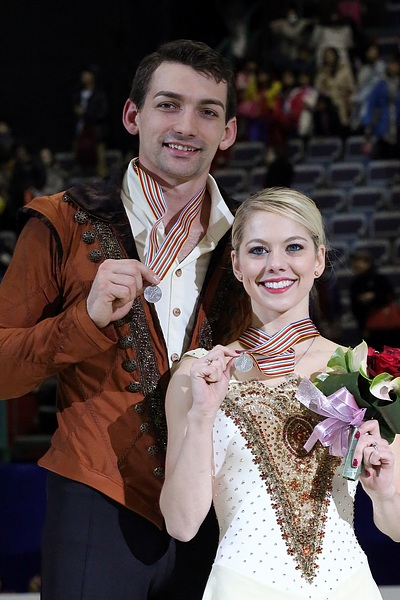
- Alexa and Chris Knierim at the 2016 Four Continents Championships

Personal information
- Full name: Alexa Paige Knierim
- Born: Alexa Paige Scimeca; June 10, 1991 (age 35) Addison, Illinois, U.S.
- Home town: Irvine, California, U.S.
- Height: 5 ft 2 in (1.57 m)

Figure skating career
- Country: United States
- Discipline: Pair skating
- Partner: Brandon Frazier (2020–23); Chris Knierim (2012–20); Ivan Dimitrov (2010–12)
- Coach: Todd Sand; Jenni Meno; Chris Knierim
- Skating club: DuPage FSC Illinois
- Began skating: 1998
- Retired: 2023

Medal record
Event	Gold medal – first place	Silver medal – second place	Bronze medal – third place
Olympic Games	1	0	1
World Championships	1	1	0
Four Continents Championships	0	1	1
Grand Prix Final	0	1	0
U.S. Championships	5	2	0
World Team Trophy	2	1	0
Medal list
Olympic Games
Gold medal – first place	2022 Beijing	Team
Bronze medal – third place	2018 Pyeongchang	Team
World Championships
Gold medal – first place	2022 Montpellier	Pairs
Silver medal – second place	2023 Saitama	Pairs
Four Continents Championships
Silver medal – second place	2016 Taipei	Pairs
Bronze medal – third place	2014 Taipei	Pairs
Grand Prix Final
Silver medal – second place	2022-23 Turin	Pairs
U.S. Championships
Gold medal – first place	2015 Greensboro	Pairs
Gold medal – first place	2018 San Jose	Pairs
Gold medal – first place	2020 Greensboro	Pairs
Gold medal – first place	2021 Las Vegas	Pairs
Gold medal – first place	2023 San Jose	Pairs
Silver medal – second place	2013 Omaha	Pairs
Silver medal – second place	2016 Saint Paul	Pairs
World Team Trophy
Gold medal – first place	2015 Tokyo	Team
Gold medal – first place	2023 Tokyo	Team
Silver medal – second place	2021 Osaka	Team

Alexa Paige Knierim (née Scimeca; born June 10, 1991) is an American former competitive pair skater. With her skating partner, Brandon Frazier, she is the 2022 World champion, the 2023 World silver medalist, a 2022 Olympic gold medalist in the figure skating team event, the 2022 Grand Prix Final silver medalist, a two-time U.S. National champion (2021, 2023), and a three-time Grand Prix gold medalist.

With her husband and former skating partner, Chris Knierim, she is a 2018 Olympic bronze medalist in the figure skating team event, a two-time Four Continents medalist (2016 silver, 2014 bronze), a three-time Grand Prix medalist (1 silver, 2 bronze), and a three-time U.S. National champion (2015, 2018, 2020). At the 2018 Winter Olympics, the Knierims became the first American pair, and the second pair ever in history, to perform a quad twist at the Olympic Games.

== Personal life ==
Alexa Scimeca was born June 10, 1991, in Addison, Illinois. She has two siblings, a brother, and a sister. She and Chris Knierim became skating partners in April 2012 and began dating about a month later. They became engaged on April 8, 2014, and married on June 26, 2016, in Colorado Springs, Colorado. Their skating partnership ended in February 2020.

In July 2025, the Knierims welcomed a son, Braxton Jeffery Knierim.

== Skating career ==
=== Early career ===
Scimeca began skating in 1998. She was coached by Trish Cazeau Brown and Sergei Telenkov from 1998 to 2008, by Maria Jeżak-Athey in 2008–2009, and by Vadim Naumov and Evgenia Shishkova from 2010 to 2011. In the 2011–2012 season, Scimeca began pair skating with Ivan Dimitrov, with whom she trained in Connecticut. In 2012, she moved to Colorado Springs, Colorado, and began being coached by Dalilah Sappenfield.

=== Teaming up with Chris Knierim and 2012–2013 season ===
Sappenfield suggested that Scimeca skate with Chris Knierim. They teamed up in April 2012. They began training with Sappenfield, Larry Ibarra, and various other coaches at the Broadmoor World Arena in Colorado Springs, Colorado.

In October, Scimeca/Knierim won the gold medal in their first-ever international event, the 2012 Coupe Internationale de Nice. After several withdrawals by other teams, they received a Grand Prix assignment, the 2012 NHK Trophy in November, where they placed fourth.

The pair won the silver medal at the 2013 U.S. Championships in January. They were assigned to the 2013 Four Continents Championships but withdrew just before the event when Scimeca injured her right foot in practice. Scimeca/Knierim were named to the U.S. team for the 2013 World Championships after Caydee Denney / John Coughlin withdrew. They placed ninth in their World Championships debut in March.

=== 2013–2014 season ===
Scimeca/Knierim experienced a setback that hampered their season when Knierim broke his left fibula in July. He underwent surgery that placed a metal plate and nine screws in his ankle. While Knierim was able to heal relatively quickly, the team believed they rushed back to competition a bit too soon. In January, they won the pewter medal at the 2014 U.S. Championships and were named second alternates to the 2014 Winter Olympic team. They then won the bronze medal at the 2014 Four Continents Championships. Their second-place short program score of 66.04 set a new record for the highest score ever achieved by a U.S. pair team. Knierim had additional surgery in March to remove the metal hardware in his leg, which had been causing discomfort.

=== 2014–2015 season: First national title ===
Scimeca/Knierim won the gold medal in their first ISU Challenger series event, the 2014 U.S. International Classic, and won the bronze medal at 2014 Nebelhorn Trophy. They were assigned two Grand Prix events, placing fourth at both 2014 Skate America and 2014 Trophée Éric Bompard.

At the 2015 U.S. Championships, Scimeca/Knierim captured their first national title, setting new U.S. record scores in both the short program and the free skate. They also became the first American pair team in history to perform a quadruple twist in competition.

At the 2015 Four Continents Championships, Scimeca/Knierim placed fifth and earned new ISU personal best scores of 124.44 in the free skate and 187.98 total, setting new records for the highest scores ever achieved by a U.S. pair team in an international event. At the 2015 World Championships, the pair placed 7th, the highest finish by a U.S. pair since 2011. They then competed at the 2015 World Team Trophy, finishing 4th in the short program and 3rd in the free skate, which ultimately was a key factor in Team USA winning the gold medal. Scimeca/Knierim earned new personal best scores of 127.87 in the free skate and 192.09 total, setting new records once again for the highest scores ever recorded by a U.S. pair team in international competition.

Scimeca/Knierim won SKATING magazine's 2015 Readers' Choice Skaters of the Year Award, also known as the Michelle Kwan Trophy.

=== 2015–2016 season: First Grand Prix medals and silver at Four Continents ===
Scimeca/Knierim began their season at 2015 Nebelhorn Trophy, where they won the silver medal behind reigning Olympic champions Tatiana Volosozhar / Maxim Trankov. The team then competed at 2015 Skate America where they won their first Grand Prix medal, a silver. They placed 1st in the short program with a new personal best score of 69.69, setting a new record for the highest score ever achieved by a U.S. pair team in international competition. The following week, they won the gold medal at 2015 Ice Challenge in Graz, Austria.

Scimeca/Knierim went on to win the bronze medal at 2015 NHK Trophy, which helped qualify them for the 2015–16 Grand Prix Final in Barcelona, where they placed seventh. They were the first U.S. pair since 2007 to qualify for the Grand Prix Final. The pair entered the 2016 U.S. Championships as the heavy favorite for the title but won the silver medal.

At the 2016 Four Continents Championships, Scimeca/Knierim won the silver medal in their best competitive outing to date. They earned new personal best scores of 140.35 in the free skate and 207.96 total, which were the highest scores ever recorded by a U.S. pair team in international competition under that version of the judging system. A subsequent injury to Knierim limited the team's training before the 2016 World Championships, where they placed 9th. They were 7th in the short program with a personal best score of 71.37, which set a new record for the highest score ever achieved by a U.S. pair team in international competition. The pair then competed for Team North America at the inaugural 2016 Team Challenge Cup, where the team won the gold medal.

=== 2016–2017 season: Major illness, surgery, and successful return ===
Alexa Scimeca Knierim became sick in April 2016, and her illness interrupted the Knierims' training throughout the summer months. She was properly diagnosed with a rare, life-threatening gastrointestinal condition in August and underwent two abdominal surgeries that month. The pair resumed light training in late September. Alexa Knierim underwent additional surgery on November 1 and returned to training by the middle of that month.

Alexa Knierim's illness involved regular episodes of vomiting, debilitating pain, difficulties with sleeping, eating, or drinking, and significant weight loss. Already small, she lost 20 pounds and shrunk to just over 80 pounds. Knierim stated that when his wife initially returned to the ice following surgery, she had to hold his hands just to skate a lap around the rink and could only skate for 10 minutes before having to go home for a nap because it was so physically draining on her body. The pair withdrew from both of their Grand Prix events, the 2016 Rostelecom Cup and 2016 Cup of China, and the 2017 U.S. Championships. They resumed full training in January and were named to the U.S. team for both the 2017 Four Continents Championships and the 2017 World Championships.

In February, the Knierims made a strong return to competition at the 2017 Four Continents Championships, where they placed sixth in a deep field of Chinese and Canadian pairs. Their total score was the second-highest score ever achieved by a U.S. pair team, behind only their score from Four Continents the prior year. The pair then competed at the 2017 World Championships, where they skated two strong programs and placed 10th in an exceptionally deep field. Just 4.35 points separated 5th through 10th place. They placed 8th in the short program with a personal best score of 72.17, the highest score ever achieved by a U.S. pair team under that version of the judging system. They were the only U.S. pair to qualify for the free skate.

Their total score of 202.37 was the second highest in U.S. pairs history, and they would remain the only U.S. pair to have ever surpassed the 200-point barrier under that version of the judging system. This was the Knierims' fourth top 10 finish in their four Worlds appearances. They were the only U.S. pair in the previous five years to have earned top-10 finishes at the World Championships.

=== 2017–2018 season: Second national title and Pyeongchang Olympics ===
The Knierims began their season at the 2017 U.S. International Classic, where they won the silver medal and were narrowly edged by Canadians Kirsten Moore-Towers and Michael Marinaro. They placed 1st in the free skate after changing their long program the week before the event. The team then competed at two Grand Prix events, 2017 NHK Trophy and 2017 Skate America, where they placed a solid fifth in deep fields at both events. It was revealed after Skate America that Chris Knierim was recovering from a patella injury. The Knierims had been the top U.S. finisher at every international event they had entered for the past three years. Their scores throughout the Grand Prix season were the clear highest by a U.S. pair team.

At the 2018 U.S. Championships, the Knierims won their second National title with a score of 206.60. They placed 1st in the short program, 1st in the free skate, and performed a quadruple twist in competition for the first time since 2016. They are one of the only pairs in the world capable of doing a quad twist. Following the event, the Knierims were named to the 2018 U.S. Olympic Team that competed at the 2018 Winter Olympics in Pyeongchang, South Korea. They were the sole U.S. pair team at this Olympic Games.

At the 2018 Winter Olympics, the Knierims won an Olympic bronze medal in the figure skating team event as a key part of the U.S. team. They placed a strong 4th in the short program with a season's best score, defeating top pairs from China, France, and Italy. They then placed 4th in the free skate. Their total combined score was the highest of their season. In the pair event, they were fourteenth in the short program and placed fifteenth overall in what was the strongest Olympic pair competition to date. In the free skate, the Knierims became the first U.S. pair, and the second pair ever in history, to successfully perform a quad twist at the Olympics.

Weeks later, the Knierims competed at the 2018 World Championships. They placed eleventh in the short program with a strong performance and were less than three points from the top 5. They finished fifteenth overall after an uncharacteristically shaky skate by Alexa that included a fall on a death spiral. They were the only U.S. pair to qualify for the free skate for the second consecutive year.

On May 14, 2018, U.S. Figure Skating announced that the Knierims had left their coach, Dalilah Sappenfield, to train with 2018 Olympic champion Aljona Savchenko and her coaching staff. They began training part-time in Oberstdorf, Germany.

=== 2018–2019 season: Third Grand Prix medal and coaching changes ===
The Knierims started their season at 2018 Nebelhorn Trophy, where they won the silver medal. They placed 1st in the short program and finished 2nd overall, just one point from 1st. They then competed at their first Grand Prix event of the season, 2018 Skate America, where they placed 4th. They were without a coach at the event, and it was announced on October 20, 2018, in the middle of the free skate, that they had very recently split from their coach Aljona Savchenko, which the Knierims confirmed after the event.

In early November, the Knierims won the bronze medal at their second Grand Prix event, 2018 NHK Trophy, ahead of Canadians Kirsten Moore-Towers and Michael Marinaro. They were coached at the event by Todd Sand and had relocated to California during the two weeks between their Grand Prix events. They officially began training with Jenni Meno and Todd Sand in late November. In early December, they won the silver medal at 2018 Golden Spin of Zagreb, placing 1st in the free skate and finishing one point from 1st overall.

In January at the 2019 U.S. Championships, the Knierims placed a very unexpected seventh after a series of unusual mishaps. In the short program, they had an uncharacteristic big error on their signature triple twist, typically their best element. In the free skate, they surprisingly aborted their second lift and missed their third lift entirely. It was revealed after the competition that Chris Knierim had been suffering from a torn wrist ligament that required surgery to repair. He remarked afterward that "the program went how our year went, a lot of unplanned mishaps." He underwent surgery to repair his wrist during the off-season.

=== 2019–2020 season: Third national title and split ===
The Knierims added Rafael Arutyunyan to their coaching team during the off-season. They had a strong start to their season at 2019 CS Nebelhorn Trophy, where they won the silver medal with a total score of 202.41. Their free skate score of 131.58 was the highest score ever achieved by a U.S. pair team under the current version of the judging system.

The Knierims then competed at their first Grand Prix event of the season, Skate Canada, where they skated strongly and placed fourth, less than three points behind reigning World silver medalists Evgenia Tarasova and Vladimir Morozov. At their second Grand Prix event, 2019 NHK Trophy, they placed fifth in the short program with a fall and a completely invalidated death spiral. After a free skate with many errors, including a costly missed lift, they placed seventh overall.

In January at the 2020 U.S. Championships, the Knierims won their third national title with a score of 216.15, the highest score ever achieved in U.S. competition. They skated a completely clean short program and scored 77.06, a new record at the U.S. Championships, and won that segment by nearly seven points. After leaving some points on the table in an otherwise strong free skate performance, they placed second in that segment and first overall after having a nearly ten-point lead over silver medalists Calalang/Johnson from the short program. The Knierims were the first U.S. pair team to win three national titles since 2002.

Less than two weeks after the U.S. Championships, the Knierims competed at the 2020 Four Continents Championships in Seoul. In the short program, they both erred on their side-by-side jump, and then Chris slipped on the entry to their side-by-side spin, invalidating the element. They placed fifth in the segment. The Knierims withdrew the morning of the free skate, citing family illness.

The Knierims were on the official entry list for the 2020 World Championships that was released on February 26, but on that same day, it was announced that Chris Knierim was stepping away from the sport, citing injuries and ongoing bouts of depression that had come to a head at the Four Continents Championships. It was also announced that Alexa Knierim would seek a new partner to continue her skating career. She stated, "I'm his wife over being his partner. We know skating ends, and life continues. For us, our marriage, our relationship is what's important." Chris Knierim added, "I look forward to watching her keep skating and will support her in every way I can. Alexa is very tenacious and strong. She's fire on the ice. Nothing can stop her."

=== 2020–2021 season: New partnership, first Grand Prix title, and fourth national title ===
On April 1, Alexa Knierim announced that she was teaming up with Brandon Frazier, who had split with his former partner, Haven Denney. The new pair started skating together in May 2020 due to restrictions caused by the COVID-19 pandemic. They began training in Irvine, California, at Great Park Ice, with coaches Todd Sand, Jenni Meno, Rafael Arutunian, Chris Knierim, and Christine Binder. They also took lessons remotely from coach Nina Mozer.

Knierim/Frazier won the gold medal in their Grand Prix debut at 2020 Skate America, which also marked their competitive debut as a pair. This event was attended by skaters training in the United States due to travel restrictions caused by the COVID-19 pandemic. The pair skated strongly and solidly in both programs, placing first in the short program with a score of 74.19 and first the free skate with a score of 140.58, for a total of 214.77 to earn their first Grand Prix title.

At the 2021 U.S. Championships in January, Knierim/Frazier won their first national title together with a score of 228.10, the highest score ever achieved in U.S. competition. They placed first in the short program with a score of 77.46 and first in the free skate with a score of 150.64, setting new U.S. Championship records in both segments. They won the gold medal by a dominant 23-point margin with two strong and well-executed programs. Knierim is the first pair skater to win four U.S. national titles since Kyoko Ina, who won her fifth title in 2002. She is also the first U.S. pair skater to win consecutive national titles with two different partners since 2012.

At the 2021 World Championships in March, Knierim/Frazier placed seventh in their Worlds debut. They skated well enough to finish seventh in both segments of the competition, despite Frazier doubling his planned triple jump in the short program and the pair counting multiple errors in the free skate. This was the best result by a U.S. pair since 2015 when Knierim achieved the same placement with her former partner.

In April, Knierim/Frazier competed at the 2021 World Team Trophy and helped Team USA win the silver medal. They placed second among the pairs after finishing fourth in the short program and second in the free skate. Their free skate score was the highest score a U.S. pair has ever received from an international judging panel under the current judging system.

=== 2021–2022 season: Beijing Olympics and World Champions ===
Knierim/Frazier skated strongly at the Cranberry Cup International, where they won the silver medal behind Russian pair Evgenia Tarasova and Vladimir Morozov. Their total score of 205.87 was a new international personal best. In September, they won the gold medal at the John Nicks Pairs Challenge, an ISU international competition in New York City. They placed 1st in both segments of the competition with two strong programs and earned all new personal best scores. Their total score of 212.55 was the highest score a U.S. pair has ever achieved under an international judging panel.

In their first Grand Prix event of the season, 2021 Skate America, Knierim/Frazier placed fourth and narrowly missed the podium, just 2.56 points behind reigning World bronze medalists Boikova/Kozlovskii. They were fifth in the short program after Frazier fell out of his triple jump. They placed second in the free skate with a strong performance, earning a new personal best score and surpassing their own record for the highest score a U.S. pair has ever earned under the current international judging system. At their second Grand Prix event, the 2021 Internationaux de France, the pair won the bronze medal. They were narrowly fourth in the short program, 1.69 points behind Canadians James/Radford, and then delivered a strong free skate to overtake the Canadians and place third in that segment just 0.59 points behind the second place Russian pair. They then competed at a Challenger event, 2021 Golden Spin of Zagreb, where they placed second in the short program, just 0.51 out of first place. After an uncharacteristically shaky free skate, they finished fifth overall.

Knierim/Frazier entered the 2022 U.S. Championships as the favorites to win and repeat as national champions. They had been the U.S. pair with the best results, the highest scores, and the most consistent scoring ability across an extended period leading into Nationals. After arriving at the competition, Frazier began to feel unwell, and he tested positive for COVID-19 on January 5, the day before the short program. The pair was forced to withdraw from the competition, and Frazier shared an emotional video message in which he expressed his devastation over not being able to compete. As the leading U.S. pair, Knierim/Frazier successfully petitioned and earned an Olympic spot. On January 9, they were named to the 2022 U.S. Olympic team and the 2022 World team, and Frazier stated he felt "100 percent back to normal." Knierim added, "I am super honored and grateful to be named to the team with Brandon. I believe the best is yet to come. We were so ready and prepared to compete here this week, it was devastating for us, but obviously, right now, we're on cloud nine." This was to be Frazier's first Olympic appearance, while Knierim became the first U.S. pair skater to make two Olympic teams in 20 years.

At the 2022 Winter Olympics in February, Knierim/Frazier were the American pair entry in the figure skating team event and helped the U.S. team win the silver medal. However following a positive doping test of Russia's gold medalist Kamila Valieva, the team members were not awarded their medals, pending an investigation. In January 2024, the Court of Arbitration for Sport disqualified her, and the gold medal was awarded to the U.S. team in August 2024. They placed a strong third in the short program segment with a clean skate and earned a new personal best score of 75.00 points. They then finished fifth in the free skate segment. In the pair event, Knierim/Frazier placed sixth, which was the best result by a U.S. pair in 20 years. They skated a clean short program and were in sixth place after that segment. In the free skate, they delivered another strong program and earned a new personal best score of 138.45 and a new personal best total score of 212.68. These scores surpassed their own records for the highest scores ever achieved by a U.S. pair under the international judging system. Frazier called the experience a "true dream come true."

In March, Knierim/Frazier won the gold medal at the 2022 World Championships in Montpellier, France. Russian skaters were banned from competing by the International Skating Union due to their country's invasion of Ukraine, and the Chinese Skating Association also did not send athletes to compete. As those countries' athletes comprised the entirety of the top five pairs at the Olympics, this had a big impact on the field for Worlds, and Knierim/Frazier entered the event as medal favorites. After skating strongly in both the short program and the free skate, the pair won their first world title by a 22-point margin with a personal best score of 221.09. They won the short program with a personal best score of 76.88. They won the free skate with another new personal best of 144.21. All of their scores set new records for the highest scores ever achieved by a U.S. pair internationally. Knierim/Frazier became the first American World champions in pairs since Babilonia/Gardner in 1979. Frazier said, "We couldn't have asked for a better ending of the season."

=== 2022–2023 season: Second World medal and fifth national title ===
Knierim/Frazier began their season in October at 2022 Skate America, where they won the gold medal, their first Grand Prix title in a full-fledged Grand Prix event. They skated a solid short program to place first in that segment and went on to place first in the free skate as well. Frazier, speaking after the free skate, noted that it was their first event of the season and that "tonight was a fight, so a lot of grit out there." Knierim/Frazier became the first U.S. pair since 2006 and the third U.S. pair in history to win a Grand Prix title.

Knierim/Frazier won the gold medal at their second Grand Prix event, 2022 MK John Wilson Trophy, by a dominant 21.66-point margin. They earned all-new season's best scores and won both segments of the competition with a strong short program and some errors in the free skate. Knierim/Frazier became the first U.S. pair to win two Grand Prix events in one season, and the first U.S. pair to qualify to the Grand Prix Final since 2015 when Knierim qualified with her former partner.

At the 2022 Grand Prix Final, Knierim/Frazier won the silver medal, narrowly missing the gold medal by just one point. They entered the event as co-favorites for the title alongside the top-seeded Miura/Kihara of Japan. In the short program, they skated cleanly except for a hand down by Frazier on their side-by-side jump, and earned a new personal best score of 77.65 to place second, only 0.43 points behind Miura/Kihara. They followed it up in the free skate with another strong performance with two shaky jumps and earned new season's best free skate and total scores. They were narrowly outscored in that segment, just 0.87 behind Miura/Kihara's skate which contained errors. Knierim/Frazier became the first U.S. pair in history to win a Grand Prix Final medal. Their total score was the second highest ever by a U.S. pair in international competition, behind only their score from the World Championships the previous season.

At the 2023 U.S. Championships, Knierim/Frazier won their second national title by a dominant 31.11 points, the largest margin of victory in history, which surpassed their own previous record set in 2021. They skated a clean short program and led the competition by a commanding 15.1 point margin. Their short program score of 81.96 set a new record for the highest score ever earned at the U.S. Championships. They went on to place first in the free skate as well with a strong performance en route to the gold medal. This was Knierim's fifth national title overall, tying her with five other skaters for the most U.S. titles by a pair skater in the past 75 years. Knierim/Frazier declined assignment to the 2023 Four Continents Championships, opting instead to participate in Art on Ice shows in Switzerland.

The leadup to the 2023 World Championships was a difficult time for the team, after their coach Todd Sand had a heart attack on March 2 and was hospitalized for an extended period. Competing in Saitama, Japan, Knierim/Frazier won the silver medal, their second consecutive world medal. They placed second in the short program after Frazier fell on his triple toe loop, but had an otherwise strong skate. They won the free skate with a strong performance despite both making jump errors, but remained second overall, 4.68 points behind Miura/Kihara. Their free skate score of 142.84 and total score of 217.48 were their season's best scores, as well as the second highest scores ever achieved by a U.S. pair, behind only their scores from the previous World Championships. Knierim/Frazier became the first U.S. pair to medal in consecutive World Championships since their coaches Jenni Meno and Todd Sand did so in 1995 and 1996. Knierim/Frazier became just the seventh U.S. pair in history to win multiple World medals. Afterwards Knierim stated, "This whole week, this whole time, this program, it was all for our coach. That's what our hearts are."

At the 2023 World Team Trophy in April, Knierim/Frazier helped Team USA win the gold medal by a dominant margin. They placed first among the pairs, winning both segments of the competition over Miura/Kihara of Team Japan. They skated a clean short program and earned a new personal best score of 82.25. In the free skate, they skated a very strong program aside from a fall on their triple salchow and earned a new personal best score of 147.87. These scores, as well as their new personal best total score of 230.12, surpassed their own records for highest scores ever achieved by a U.S. pair team.

== Post-competitive career ==
Following the 2022–23 figure skating season, Knierim/Frazier left competitive skating for the foreseeable future. Knierim moved to Illinois to begin coaching after her husband, Chris, took a job as a skating director there.

During the 2024 Paris Olympics, a medal ceremony was held for Knierim/Frazier and their teammates from the 2022 Olympic Figure Skating Team Event, where they were awarded their newly allocated Olympic team gold medals.

== Programs ==
=== Pair skating with Brandon Frazier ===
Season	Short program	Free skating	Exhibition
2022–2023	Separate Ways (Worlds Apart) by Journey Remixed by Bryce Miller, Alloy Tracks (from Stranger Things) choreo. by Shae-Lynn Bourne	Sign of the Times by Harry Styles choreo. by John Kerr and Sinead Kerr	Shallow by Lady Gaga & Bradley Cooper; Fix You by Coldplay choreo. by Renée Roca
2021–2022	The House of the Rising Sun by Heavy Young Heathens choreo. by Shae-Lynn Bourne	Fix You by Coldplay & Fearless Soul choreo. by Renée Roca	Tore My Heart by Oona Garthwaite choreo. by Cindy Stuart; Shallow by Lady Gaga & Bradley Cooper
2020–2021	In the End by Linkin Park performed by Tommee Profitt; Too Far Gone by Hidden Citizens	Fall on Me by Andrea Bocelli & Matteo Bocelli	

=== Pair skating with Chris Knierim ===
Season	Short program	Free skating	Exhibition
2019–2020	At Last by Beyonce Knowles choreo. by Benoit Richaud	Drop of Fragrance by Maxime Rodriguez; Experience by Ludovico Einaudi choreo. by Benoit Richaud	American Woman by Lenny Kravitz
2018–2019	Castle by Halsey	Wicked Game by James Vincent McMorrow	Goodbye My Lover by James Blunt
2017–2018	Come What May (from Moulin Rouge!) by Nicole Kidman & Ewan McGregor; Paint It Black by The Rolling Stones performed by Ciara and the London Symphony Orchestra	Ghost the Musical (including Unchained Melody) by Bruce Joel Rubin, Dave Stewart, and Glen Ballard; Charlie Chaplin Medley	Rush Medley; Nothing Else Matters by Metallica
2016–2017	Come What May (from Moulin Rouge!) by Nicole Kidman & Ewan McGregor	Ghost the Musical (including Unchained Melody) by Bruce Joel Rubin, Dave Stewart, and Glen Ballard	Rise Up by Andra Day
2015–2016	Nothing Else Matters by Metallica choreo. by Julie Marcotte	Elizabeth: The Golden Age by Craig Armstrong and A. R. Rahman choreo. by Julie Marcotte	Rise Up by Andra Day; The Flower Duet by Léo Delibes performed by Florentine Opera
2014–2015	El Tango de Roxanne (from Moulin Rouge!) choreo. by Julie Marcotte	An American in Paris by George Gershwin, orchestra conducted by Leonard Bernstein choreo. by Julie Marcotte	Girls Just Want to Have Fun by Cyndi Lauper; Macho Man by Village People; You Are So Beautiful by Joe Cocker
2013–2014	Papa, Can You Hear Me? (from Yentl) by Michel Legrand choreo. by Catarina Lindgren	Ever After by George Fenton choreo. by Igor Shpilband	Hopelessly Devoted to You; You're the One That I Want; Summer Nights (from Grease)
2012–2013	Moonlight Sonata by Ludwig van Beethoven	Life Is Beautiful by Nicola Piovani; Last of the Mohicans by Randy Edelman; 500 Nations by Peter Buffett	Just a Kiss by Lady Antebellum

== Competitive highlights ==
- GP – Event of the ISU Grand Prix Series
- CS – Event of the ISU Challenger Series
- WD – Withdrew from competition
- Medals at team events are awarded for the team result only. Individual placements at team events are listed in parentheses.

=== Pair skating with Brandon Frazier ===
Competition placements at senior level
Season	2020–21	2021–22	2022–23
Winter Olympics		6th	
Winter Olympics (Team event)		1st	
World Championships	7th	1st	2nd
Grand Prix Final			2nd
U.S. Championships	1st		1st
World Team Trophy	2nd (2nd)		1st (1st)
GP France		3rd	
GP Skate America	1st	4th	1st
GP Wilson Trophy			1st
CS Golden Spin of Zagreb		5th	
Cranberry Cup		2nd	
John Nicks Challenge		1st	

=== Pair skating with Chris Knierim ===
Competition placements at senior level
Season	2012–13	2013–14	2014–15	2015–16	2016–17	2017–18	2018–19	2019–20
Winter Olympics						15th		
Winter Olympics (Team event)						3rd		
World Championships	9th		7th	9th	10th	15th		
Four Continents Championships		3rd	5th	2nd	6th			WD
Grand Prix Final				7th				
U.S. Championships	2nd	4th	1st	2nd		1st	7th	1st
World Team Trophy			1st (4th)					
GP Cup of China		5th						
GP France			4th					
GP NHK Trophy	4th			3rd		5th	3rd	7th
GP Rostelecom Cup		6th						
GP Skate America			4th	2nd		5th	4th	
GP Skate Canada								4th
CS Golden Spin of Zagreb							2nd	
CS Ice Challenge				1st				
CS Nebelhorn Trophy			3rd	2nd			2nd	2nd
CS U.S. Classic			1st			2nd		
Cup of Nice	1st							
Ondrej Nepela Trophy		3rd						
Team Challenge Cup				1st (3rd)				

=== Pair skating with Ivan Dimitrov ===
Competition placements at senior level
Season	2011–12
U.S. Championships	10th

== Detailed results ==
- Small medals for the short program and free skating are only awarded at ISU Championships.
- At national events in the United States, pewter medals are awarded for fourth place.
- Medals at team events are awarded for the team results only. Individual placements at team events are listed in parentheses.

=== Pair skating with Brandon Frazier ===
ISU personal best scores in the +5/-5 GOE System
Segment	Type	Score	Event
Total	TSS	230.12	2023 World Team Trophy
Short program	TSS	82.25	2023 World Team Trophy
Short program	TES	45.38	2023 World Team Trophy
Short program	PCS	36.87	2023 World Team Trophy
Free skating	TSS	147.87	2023 World Team Trophy
Free skating	TES	74.71	2023 World Team Trophy
Free skating	PCS	74.16	2023 World Team Trophy

Results in the 2020–21 season
Date	Event	SP		FS		Total	
Date	Event	P	Score	P	Score	P	Score
Oct 25–27, 2020	(United States) 2020 Skate America	1	74.19	1	140.58	1	214.77
Jan 11–21, 2021	(United States) 2021 U.S. Championships	1	77.46	1	150.64	1	228.10
Mar 22–28, 2021	(Sweden) 2021 World Championships	7	64.67	7	127.43	7	192.10
Apr 15–18, 2021	(Japan) 2021 World Team Trophy	4	65.68	2	133.63	2 (2)	199.31

Results in the 2021–22 season
Date	Event	SP		FS		Total	
Date	Event	P	Score	P	Score	P	Score
Aug 11–15, 2021	(United States) 2021 Cranberry Cup International	2	69.83	2	136.04	2	205.87
Sep 9–10, 2021	(United States) 2021 John Nicks Pairs Challenge	1	76.09	1	136.46	1	212.55
Oct 22–24, 2021	(United States) 2021 Skate America	5	66.37	2	136.60	4	202.97
Nov 19–21, 2021	2021 Internationaux de France	4	70.15	3	131.54	3	201.69
Dec 9–11, 2021	(Croatia) 2021 CS Golden Spin of Zagreb	2	66.44	5	120.25	5	186.69
Feb 4–7, 2022	(China) 2022 Winter Olympics (Team event)	3	75.00	5	128.97	1	–
Feb 18–19, 2022	(China) 2022 Winter Olympics	6	74.23	7	138.45	6	212.68
Mar 21–27, 2022	(France) 2022 World Championships	1	76.88	1	144.21	1	221.09

Results in the 2022–23 season
Date	Event	SP		FS		Total	
Date	Event	P	Score	P	Score	P	Score
Oct 21–23, 2022	(United States) 2022 Skate America	1	75.19	1	126.20	1	201.39
Nov 11–13, 2022	(United Kingdom) 2022 MK John Wilson Trophy	1	75.88	1	129.97	1	205.85
Dec 8–11, 2022	(Italy) 2022–23 Grand Prix Final	2	77.65	2	135.63	2	213.28
Jan 23–29, 2022	(United States) 2023 U.S. Championships	1	81.96	1	146.01	1	227.97
Mar 22–26, 2023	(Japan) 2023 World Championships	2	74.64	1	142.84	2	217.48
Apr 13–16, 2023	(Japan) 2023 World Team Trophy	1	82.25	1	147.87	1 (1)	230.12

=== Pair skating with Chris Knierim ===
ISU personal best scores in the +5/-5 GOE System
Segment	Type	Score	Event
Total	TSS	202.41	2019 CS Nebelhorn Trophy
Short program	TSS	71.28	2019 Skate Canada International
Short program	TES	39.99	2019 CS Nebelhorn Trophy
Short program	PCS	32.77	2019 Skate Canada International
Free skating	TSS	131.58	2019 CS Nebelhorn Trophy
Free skating	TES	66.06	2019 CS Nebelhorn Trophy
Free skating	PCS	65.52	2019 CS Nebelhorn Trophy

ISU personal best scores in the +3/-3 GOE System
Segment	Type	Score	Event
Total	TSS	207.96	2016 Four Continents Championships
Short program	TSS	72.17	2017 World Championships
Short program	TES	40.74	2017 World Championships
Short program	PCS	32.80	2016 World Championships
Free skating	TSS	140.35	2016 Four Continents Championships
Free skating	TES	73.90	2016 Four Continents Championships
Free skating	PCS	66.45	2016 Four Continents Championships

Results in the 2012–13 season
Date	Event	SP		FS		Total	
Date	Event	P	Score	P	Score	P	Score
Oct 24–28, 2012	(France) 2012 International Cup of Nice	1	59.01	2	96.99	1	156.00
Nov 22–25, 2012	(Japan) 2012 NHK Trophy	5	54.41	4	108.69	4	163.10
Jan 20–27, 2013	(United States) 2013 U.S. Championships	3	52.79	1	119.96	2	172.75
Mar 11–17, 2013	(Canada) 2013 World Championships	12	55.73	9	117.78	9	173.51

Results in the 2013–14 season
Date	Event	SP		FS		Total	
Date	Event	P	Score	P	Score	P	Score
Oct 2–5, 2013	(Slovakia) 2013 Ondrej Nepela Trophy	2	51.17	3	102.17	3	153.34
Nov 1–3, 2013	2013 Cup of China	4	57.99	6	103.73	5	161.71
Nov 22–24, 2-13	(Russia) 2013 Rostelecom Cup	5	59.56	6	103.73	6	173.70
Jan 5–12, 2014	(United States) 2014 U.S. Championships	5	64.68	4	124.99	4	189.67
Jan 20–25, 2014	(Taiwan) 2014 Four Continents Championships	2	66.04	4	104.31	3	170.35

Results in the 2014–15 season
Date	Event	SP		FS		Total	
Date	Event	P	Score	P	Score	P	Score
Sep 11–14, 2014	(United States) 2014 CS U.S. International Classic	2	49.00	1	114.24	1	163.24
Sep 25–27, 2014	(Germany) 2014 CS Nebelhorn Trophy	3	55.29	3	110.81	3	166.10
Oct 23–26, 2014	(United States) 2014 Skate America	4	60.61	4	108.01	4	168.62
Nov 20–23, 2014	(France) 2014 Trophée Éric Bompard	4	59.04	3	120.28	4	179.32
Jan 17–25, 2015	(United States) 2015 U.S. Championships	1	74.01	1	136.48	1	210.49
Feb 10–15, 2015	(South Korea) 2015 Four Continents Championships	5	63.54	5	124.44	5	187.98
Mar 23–29, 2015	(China) 2015 World Championships	7	65.56	7	120.25	7	185.81
Mar 23–29, 2015	(Japan) 2015 World Team Trophy	4	64.22	3	127.87	1 (4)	192.09

Results in the 2015–16 season
Date	Event	SP		FS		Total	
Date	Event	P	Score	P	Score	P	Score
Sep 23–26, 2015	(Germany) 2015 CS Nebelhorn Trophy	4	58.00	2	121.56	2	179.56
Oct 22–25, 2015	(United States) 2015 Skate America	1	69.69	4	122.28	2	191.97
Oct 27–31, 2015	(Austria) 2015 CS Ice Challenge	1	68.74	1	120.54	1	189.28
Nov 26–29, 2015	(Japan) 2015 NHK Trophy	2	68.43	3	122.23	3	190.66
Dec 10–13, 2015	(Spain) 2015–16 Grand Prix Final	6	68.14	7	109.28	7	177.42
Jan 15–24, 2016	(United States) 2016 U.S. Championships	2	67.35	2	129.45	2	196.80
Feb 16–21, 2016	(Taiwan) 2016 Four Continents Championships	3	67.61	2	140.35	2	207.96
Mar 28 – Apr 3, 2016	(United States) 2016 World Championships	7	71.37	12	118.69	9	190.06
Apr 22–24, 2016	(United States) 2016 Team Challenge Cup	–	–	3	122.15	1 (3)	–

Results in the 2016–17 season
Date	Event	SP		FS		Total	
Date	Event	P	Score	P	Score	P	Score
Feb 14–19, 2017	(South Korea) 2017 Four Continents Championships	6	69.10	6	124.81	6	193.91
Mar 29 – Apr 2, 2017	(Finland) 2017 World Championships	8	72.17	11	130.20	10	202.37

Results in the 2017–18 season
Date	Event	SP		FS		Total	
Date	Event	P	Score	P	Score	P	Score
Sep 14–16, 2017	(United States) 2017 CS U.S. International Classic	3	61.32	1	124.76	2	186.08
Nov 10–12, 2017	(Japan) 2017 NHK Trophy	4	65.86	5	126.65	5	192.51
Nov 24–26, 2017	(United States) 2017 Skate America	5	64.27	6	124.80	5	192.51
Jan 3–7, 2018	(United States) 2018 U.S. Championships	1	71.10	1	135.50	1	206.60
Feb 9–12, 2018	(South Korea) 2018 Winter Olympics (Team event)	4	69.75	4	126.56	3	–
Feb 14–25, 2018	(South Korea) 2018 Winter Olympics	14	65.55	15	120.27	15	185.82
Mar 19–25, 2018	(Italy) 2018 World Championships	11	69.55	15	112.49	15	182.04

Results in the 2018–19 season
Date	Event	SP		FS		Total	
Date	Event	P	Score	P	Score	P	Score
Sep 26–29, 2018	(Germany) 2018 CS Nebelhorn Trophy	1	61.73	3	115.49	2	177.22
Oct 19–21, 2018	(United States) 2018 Skate America	5	57.31	4	114.25	4	171.56
Nov 9–11, 2018	(Japan) 2018 NHK Trophy	4	64.75	3	125.74	3	190.49
Dec 5–8, 2018	(Croatia) 2018 CS Golden Spin of Zagreb	3	64.04	1	118.80	2	182.84
Jan 19–27, 2019	(United States) 2019 U.S. Championships	7	61.56	7	109.86	7	171.42

Results in the 2019–20 season
Date	Event	SP		FS		Total	
Date	Event	P	Score	P	Score	P	Score
Sep 25–28, 2019	(Germany) 2019 CS Nebelhorn Trophy	2	70.83	2	131.58	2	202.41
Oct 25–27, 2019	2019 Skate Canada International	4	71.28	4	128.29	4	199.57
Nov 22–24, 2019	(Japan) 2019 NHK Trophy	5	63.63	8	109.70	7	173.33
Jan 18–27, 2020	(United States) 2020 U.S. Championships	1	77.06	2	139.09	1	216.15
Feb 4–9, 2020	(South Korea) 2020 Four Continents Championships	5	63.14	–	–	–	WD

=== Pair skating with Ivan Dimitrov ===
Results in the 2005–06 season
Date	Event	SP		FS		Total	
Date	Event	P	Score	P	Score	P	Score
Jan 22–29, 2012	(United States) 2012 U.S. Championships	8	51.93	11	80.69	10	132.62
