= ISU Grand Prix of Figure Skating =

Annual figure skating competition series

Grand Prix of Figure Skating
- Status: Active
- Frequency: Annual
- Countries: Canada; China; Finland; France; Japan; United States
- Inaugurated: 1995–96 Champions Series
- Previous event: 2025–26 Grand Prix Series
- Next event: 2026–27 Grand Prix Series
- Organizer: International Skating Union; Skate Canada; Chinese Skating Association; Skating Finland; French Federation of Ice Sports; Japan Skating Federation; U.S. Figure Skating

The ISU Grand Prix of Figure Skating – originally known as the Champions Series – is a series of senior-level international figure skating competitions sanctioned by the International Skating Union. Though none of the events were new, they debuted as a unified series in 1995. The Grand Prix consists of six qualifying events, held in succession over a span of six weeks, plus the Grand Prix of Figure Skating Final. Currently, Grand Prix events are hosted by Canada (Skate Canada International), China (Cup of China), Finland (Grand Prix of Finland), France (Grand Prix de France), Japan (NHK Trophy), and the United States (Skate America). Previous events were hosted by Germany (Bofrost Cup on Ice) and Russia (Rostelecom Cup). Medals are awarded in men's singles, women's singles, pair skating, and ice dance. Skaters earn points based on their results at their respective competitions, and after the six qualifying events, the top skaters or teams in each discipline are invited to compete at the Grand Prix Final.

== History ==
Beginning with the 1995–96 season, the International Skating Union (ISU) launched the Champions Series – later renamed the Grand Prix Series – which, at its inception, consisted of five qualifying competitions and the Champions Series Final. This allowed skaters to perfect their programs earlier in the season, as well as compete against the skaters whom they would later encounter at the World Figure Skating Championships. This series also provided the viewing public with additional televised skating, which had been in demand. The five qualifying competitions during this inaugural season were the Nations Cup, the NHK Trophy, the Skate America, the Skate Canada, and the Trophée de France. Skaters earned points based on their results in their respective competitions and the top skaters or teams in each discipline were then invited to compete at the Champions Series Final.

The Grand Prix Series currently comprises the following competitions:

- Skate Canada International: The first Skate Canada competition was held in 1973 in Calgary, Alberta. When the ISU launched the Champions Series in 1995, Skate Canada International was one of the five qualifying events. It has been a Grand Prix event every year since, except for 2020, when it was cancelled due to the COVID-19 pandemic.
- Cup of China: The first Cup of China was held in 2003 in Beijing as a replacement for the Bofrost Cup on Ice. The Cup of China has been interrupted three times in its history: in 2018 when the Chinese Skating Association elected to forgo hosting any international skating events in order to prepare its venues for the 2022 Winter Olympics, and then in 2021 and 2022 due to the COVID-19 pandemic.
- Grand Prix of Finland: The first Grand Prix of Finland was held in 2018 in Helsinki as a replacement for the Cup of China. It returned in 2022 as a replacement for the Rostelecom Cup after Russia was banned from hosting any international figure skating competitions following the Russian invasion of Ukraine. This event has been held under several names, including the Grand Prix of Helsinki, the Grand Prix of Espoo, and the Finlandia Trophy.
- Grand Prix de France: The first iteration of the Grand Prix de France – then called the Grand Prix International de Paris – was held in 1987 in Paris. When the ISU launched the Champions Series in 1995, the Grand Prix de France was one of the five qualifying events. It has been a Grand Prix event every year since, except for 2020, when it was cancelled due to the COVID-19 pandemic. The Grand Prix de France has been held under several names, including the Trophée de France, the Trophée Lalique, the Trophée Éric Bompard, and the Internationaux de France.
- NHK Trophy: The first NHK Trophy was held in 1979 in Tokyo. When the ISU launched the Champions Series in 1995, the NHK Trophy was one of the five qualifying events. It has been a Grand Prix event every year since.
- Skate America: The first Skate America – then called the Norton Skate – was held in 1979 in Lake Placid, New York, as a test event for the 1980 Winter Olympics. When the ISU launched the Champions Series in 1995, Skate America was one of the five qualifying events. It has been a Grand Prix event every year since.
- Grand Prix of Figure Skating Final: This event is the culminating event of the Grand Prix Series. Skaters earn points based on their results at qualifying competitions each season, and the top skaters or teams in each discipline are invited to then compete at the Grand Prix of Figure Skating Final. Due to the COVID-19 pandemic, the 2020 Grand Prix Final was at first postponed, and then cancelled in December 2020. In response to the discovery of the SARS-CoV-2 Omicron variant in November 2021, the 2021 Grand Prix Final was cancelled as well.

The following competitions have been discontinued:

- Bofrost Cup on Ice: The first iteration of the Bofrost Cup on Ice – then called the Fujifilm Trophy – was held in 1986 in Frankfurt. When the ISU launched the Champions Series in 1995, the German competition – at that point called the Nations Cup – was one of the five qualifying events. It remained a Grand Prix event until 2002, after which point it was supplanted by the Cup of China. This event was held under several names, including the Sparkassen Cup on Ice. Despite losing its spot in the Grand Prix series, the German Ice Skating Union continued to stage the competition, but it did not continue after 2004.
- Rostelecom Cup: The first iteration of the Rostelecom Cup – originally known as the Cup of Russia – was held in 1996 in Saint Petersburg as part of the Champions Series. It was a Grand Prix event every year until the ISU barred Russia from hosting international skating competitions after the Russian invasion of Ukraine in February 2022.

The following competitions were held only one time:

- Gran Premio d'Italia: The 2021 Cup of China was cancelled due to travel and quarantine restrictions related to the COVID-19 pandemic. The Gran Premio d'Italia was held as a replacement event in Turin in November 2021.
- MK John Wilson Trophy: In July 2022, the ISU announced the cancellation of the 2022 Cup of China due to China's ongoing travel restrictions related to the COVID-19 pandemic. The MK John Wilson Trophy was held as a replacement event in Sheffield, England, in November 2022.

The International Skating Union established the Junior Grand Prix of Figure Skating in 1997 as a comparable series to the Grand Prix series. It consists of a series of seven international figure skating competitions exclusively for junior-level skaters. The locations of the Junior Grand Prix events change every year. Skaters earn points based on their results each season, and the top skaters or teams in each discipline are then invited to compete at the Junior Grand Prix of Figure Skating Final. Beginning with the 2008–09 figure skating season, the Grand Prix Final and Junior Grand Prix Final have been held concurrently.

On 30 June 2026, the ISU announced that figure skaters from Russia and Belarus, who had been banned from attending any international competitions following the 2022 Russian invasion of Ukraine since 1 March 2022, would be allowed to return to competition, but as Individual Neutral Athletes (AINs). Skaters were required to undergo an individual assessment conducted by the ISU to determine whether they met the criteria for neutral status, which included having not previously taken active part in military operations in the war against Ukraine, nor having actively and publicly supported the war. As AINs, Russian and Belarusian skaters were required to compete without items of state recognition such as their national flags or anthems.

== Grand Prix champions ==
Color key

The Gran Premio d'Italia served as a substitute event for the Cup of China in 2021.
The MK John Wilson Trophy served as a substitute event for the Cup of China in 2022.

=== Men's singles ===
Men's event champions
Year	Skate Canada International	Cup of China	Grand Prix of Finland	Grand Prix de France	Bofrost Cup on Ice	NHK Trophy	Rostelecom Cup	Skate America	Grand Prix Final
1995	(Russia) Alexei Urmanov	No competitions prior to 2003	No competitions prior to 2018	(Russia) Ilia Kulik	(Ukraine) Vyacheslav Zahorodnyuk	(Canada) Elvis Stojko	No competitions prior to 1996	(United States) Todd Eldredge	(Russia) Alexei Urmanov
1996	(Canada) Elvis Stojko	No competitions prior to 2003	No competitions prior to 2018	(United States) Todd Eldredge	(Russia) Alexei Urmanov	(Canada) Elvis Stojko	(Russia) Alexei Urmanov	(United States) Todd Eldredge	(Canada) Elvis Stojko
1997	(Canada) Elvis Stojko	No competitions prior to 2003	No competitions prior to 2018	(Russia) Alexei Yagudin	(Canada) Elvis Stojko	(Russia) Ilia Kulik	(Russia) Alexei Yagudin	(United States) Todd Eldredge	(Russia) Ilia Kulik
1998	(Russia) Evgeni Plushenko	No competitions prior to 2003	No competitions prior to 2018	(Russia) Alexei Yagudin	(Russia) Alexei Yagudin	(Russia) Evgeni Plushenko	(Russia) Alexei Urmanov	(Russia) Alexei Yagudin	(Russia) Alexei Yagudin
1999	(Russia) Alexei Yagudin	No competitions prior to 2003	No competitions prior to 2018	(Russia) Alexei Yagudin	(Russia) Evgeni Plushenko	(Russia) Evgeni Plushenko	(Russia) Evgeni Plushenko	(Russia) Alexei Yagudin	(Russia) Evgeni Plushenko
2000	(Russia) Alexei Yagudin	No competitions prior to 2003	No competitions prior to 2018	(Russia) Alexei Yagudin	(Russia) Evgeni Plushenko	(Russia) Evgeni Plushenko	(Russia) Evgeni Plushenko	(United States) Timothy Goebel	(Russia) Evgeni Plushenko
2001	(Russia) Alexei Yagudin	No competitions prior to 2003	No competitions prior to 2018	(Russia) Alexei Yagudin	(Russia) Evgeni Plushenko	(Japan) Takeshi Honda	(Russia) Evgeni Plushenko	(United States) Timothy Goebel	(Russia) Alexei Yagudin
2002	(Japan) Takeshi Honda	No competitions prior to 2003	No competitions prior to 2018	(United States) Michael Weiss	(Russia) Evgeni Plushenko	(Russia) Ilia Klimkin	(Russia) Evgeni Plushenko	(France) Brian Joubert	(Russia) Evgeni Plushenko
2003	(Russia) Evgeni Plushenko	(United States) Timothy Goebel	No competitions prior to 2018	(Russia) Evgeni Plushenko	No Grand Prix competitions since 2002	(Canada) Jeffrey Buttle	(Russia) Evgeni Plushenko	(United States) Michael Weiss	(Canada) Emanuel Sandhu
2004	(Canada) Emanuel Sandhu	(Canada) Jeffrey Buttle	No competitions prior to 2018	(United States) Johnny Weir	No Grand Prix competitions since 2002	(United States) Johnny Weir	(Russia) Evgeni Plushenko	(France) Brian Joubert	(Russia) Evgeni Plushenko
2005	(Canada) Emanuel Sandhu	(Canada) Emanuel Sandhu	No competitions prior to 2018	(Canada) Jeffrey Buttle	No Grand Prix competitions since 2002	(Japan) Nobunari Oda	(Russia) Evgeni Plushenko	(Japan) Daisuke Takahashi	(Switzerland) Stéphane Lambiel
2006	(Switzerland) Stéphane Lambiel	(United States) Evan Lysacek	No competitions prior to 2018	(France) Brian Joubert	No Grand Prix competitions since 2002	(Japan) Daisuke Takahashi	(France) Brian Joubert	(Japan) Nobunari Oda	(France) Brian Joubert
2007	(France) Brian Joubert	(United States) Johnny Weir	No competitions prior to 2018	(Canada) Patrick Chan	No Grand Prix competitions since 2002	(Japan) Daisuke Takahashi	(United States) Johnny Weir	(Japan) Daisuke Takahashi	(Switzerland) Stéphane Lambiel
2008	(Canada) Patrick Chan	(United States) Jeremy Abbott	No competitions prior to 2018	(Canada) Patrick Chan	No Grand Prix competitions since 2002	(Japan) Nobunari Oda	(France) Brian Joubert	(Japan) Takahiko Kozuka	(United States) Jeremy Abbott
2009	(United States) Jeremy Abbott	(Japan) Nobunari Oda	No competitions prior to 2018	(Japan) Nobunari Oda	No Grand Prix competitions since 2002	(France) Brian Joubert	(Russia) Evgeni Plushenko	(United States) Evan Lysacek	(United States) Evan Lysacek
2010	(Canada) Patrick Chan	(Japan) Takahiko Kozuka	No competitions prior to 2018	(Japan) Takahiko Kozuka	No Grand Prix competitions since 2002	(Japan) Daisuke Takahashi	(Czech Republic) Tomáš Verner	(Japan) Daisuke Takahashi	(Canada) Patrick Chan
2011	(Canada) Patrick Chan	(United States) Jeremy Abbott	No competitions prior to 2018	(Canada) Patrick Chan	No Grand Prix competitions since 2002	(Japan) Daisuke Takahashi	(Japan) Yuzuru Hanyu	(Czech Republic) Michal Březina	(Canada) Patrick Chan
2012	(Spain) Javier Fernández	(Japan) Tatsuki Machida	No competitions prior to 2018	(Japan) Takahito Mura	No Grand Prix competitions since 2002	(Japan) Yuzuru Hanyu	(Canada) Patrick Chan	(Japan) Takahiko Kozuka	(Japan) Daisuke Takahashi
2013	(Canada) Patrick Chan	(China) Yan Han	No competitions prior to 2018	(Canada) Patrick Chan	No Grand Prix competitions since 2002	(Japan) Daisuke Takahashi	(Japan) Tatsuki Machida	(Japan) Tatsuki Machida	(Japan) Yuzuru Hanyu
2014	(Japan) Takahito Mura	(Russia) Maxim Kovtun	No competitions prior to 2018	(Russia) Maxim Kovtun	No Grand Prix competitions since 2002	(Japan) Daisuke Murakami	(Spain) Javier Fernández	(Japan) Tatsuki Machida	(Japan) Yuzuru Hanyu
2015	(Canada) Patrick Chan	(Spain) Javier Fernández	No competitions prior to 2018	(Japan) Shoma Uno	No Grand Prix competitions since 2002	(Japan) Yuzuru Hanyu	(Spain) Javier Fernández	(United States) Max Aaron	(Japan) Yuzuru Hanyu
2016	(Canada) Patrick Chan	(Canada) Patrick Chan	No competitions prior to 2018	(Spain) Javier Fernández	No Grand Prix competitions since 2002	(Japan) Yuzuru Hanyu	(Spain) Javier Fernández	(Japan) Shoma Uno	(Japan) Yuzuru Hanyu
2017	(Japan) Shoma Uno	(Russia) Mikhail Kolyada	No competitions prior to 2018	(Spain) Javier Fernández	No Grand Prix competitions since 2002	(Russia) Sergei Voronov	(United States) Nathan Chen	(United States) Nathan Chen	(United States) Nathan Chen
2018	(Japan) Shoma Uno	Competition cancelled	(Japan) Yuzuru Hanyu	(United States) Nathan Chen	No Grand Prix competitions since 2002	(Japan) Shoma Uno	(Japan) Yuzuru Hanyu	(United States) Nathan Chen	(United States) Nathan Chen
2019	(Japan) Yuzuru Hanyu	(China) Jin Boyang	No competitions held	(United States) Nathan Chen	No Grand Prix competitions since 2002	(Japan) Yuzuru Hanyu	(Russia) Alexander Samarin	(United States) Nathan Chen	(United States) Nathan Chen
2020	Competition cancelled	(China) Jin Boyang	No competitions held	Competition cancelled	No Grand Prix competitions since 2002	(Japan) Yuma Kagiyama	(Russia) Mikhail Kolyada	(United States) Nathan Chen	Competition cancelled
2021	(United States) Nathan Chen	(Japan) Yuma Kagiyama (Note: The 2021 Gran Premio d'Italia served as a substitute for the Cup of China.)	No competitions held	(Japan) Yuma Kagiyama	No Grand Prix competitions since 2002	(Japan) Shoma Uno	(Georgia (country)) Morisi Kvitelashvili	(United States) Vincent Zhou	Competition cancelled
2022	(Japan) Shoma Uno	(Italy) Daniel Grassl (Note: The 2022 MK John Wilson Trophy served as a substitute for the Cup of China.)	(United States) Ilia Malinin	(France) Adam Siao Him Fa	No Grand Prix competitions since 2002	(Japan) Shoma Uno	No competitions since 2021	(United States) Ilia Malinin	(Japan) Shoma Uno
2023	(Japan) Sōta Yamamoto	(France) Adam Siao Him Fa	(Japan) Kao Miura	(France) Adam Siao Him Fa	No Grand Prix competitions since 2002	(Japan) Yuma Kagiyama	No competitions since 2021	(United States) Ilia Malinin	(United States) Ilia Malinin
2024	(United States) Ilia Malinin	(Japan) Shun Sato	(Japan) Yuma Kagiyama	(France) Adam Siao Him Fa	No Grand Prix competitions since 2002	(Japan) Yuma Kagiyama	No competitions since 2021	(United States) Ilia Malinin	(United States) Ilia Malinin
2025	(United States) Ilia Malinin	(Japan) Shun Sato	(Japan) Yuma Kagiyama	(United States) Ilia Malinin	No Grand Prix competitions since 2002	(Japan) Yuma Kagiyama	No competitions since 2021	(France) Kévin Aymoz	(United States) Ilia Malinin
2026	(France) Kévin Aymoz	(Japan) Kao Miura		(France) Adam Siao Him Fa	No Grand Prix competitions since 2002		No competitions since 2021	(United States) Ilia Malinin	

=== Women's singles ===
Women's event champions
Year	Skate Canada International	Cup of China	Grand Prix of Finland	Grand Prix de France	Bofrost Cup on Ice	NHK Trophy	Rostelecom Cup	Skate America	Grand Prix Final
1995	(United States) Michelle Kwan	No competitions prior to 2003	No competitions prior to 2018	(Canada) Josée Chouinard	(United States) Michelle Kwan	(China) Chen Lu	No competitions prior to 1996	(United States) Michelle Kwan	(United States) Michelle Kwan
1996	(Russia) Irina Slutskaya	No competitions prior to 2003	No competitions prior to 2018	(United States) Michelle Kwan	(Russia) Irina Slutskaya	(Russia) Maria Butyrskaya	(Russia) Irina Slutskaya	(United States) Michelle Kwan	(United States) Tara Lipinski
1997	(United States) Michelle Kwan	No competitions prior to 2003	No competitions prior to 2018	(France) Laëtitia Hubert	(Germany) Tanja Szewczenko	(Germany) Tanja Szewczenko	(Russia) Irina Slutskaya	(United States) Michelle Kwan	(United States) Tara Lipinski
1998	(Ukraine) Elena Liashenko	No competitions prior to 2003	No competitions prior to 2018	(Russia) Maria Butyrskaya	(Russia) Elena Sokolova	(Uzbekistan) Tatiana Malinina	(Russia) Elena Sokolova	(Russia) Maria Butyrskaya	(Uzbekistan) Tatiana Malinina
1999	(United States) Michelle Kwan	No competitions prior to 2003	No competitions prior to 2018	(Russia) Maria Butyrskaya	(Russia) Maria Butyrskaya	(Russia) Maria Butyrskaya	(Russia) Irina Slutskaya	(United States) Michelle Kwan	(Russia) Irina Slutskaya
2000	(Russia) Irina Slutskaya	No competitions prior to 2003	No competitions prior to 2018	(Russia) Maria Butyrskaya	(Russia) Maria Butyrskaya	(Russia) Irina Slutskaya	(Russia) Irina Slutskaya	(United States) Michelle Kwan	(Russia) Irina Slutskaya
2001	(United States) Sarah Hughes	No competitions prior to 2003	No competitions prior to 2018	(Russia) Maria Butyrskaya	(Russia) Maria Butyrskaya	(Uzbekistan) Tatiana Malinina	(Russia) Irina Slutskaya	(United States) Michelle Kwan	(Russia) Irina Slutskaya
2002	(United States) Sasha Cohen	No competitions prior to 2003	No competitions prior to 2018	(United States) Sasha Cohen	(Japan) Yoshie Onda	(Japan) Yoshie Onda	(Russia) Viktoria Volchkova	(United States) Michelle Kwan	(United States) Sasha Cohen
2003	(United States) Sasha Cohen	(Ukraine) Elena Liashenko	No competitions prior to 2018	(United States) Sasha Cohen	No Grand Prix competitions since 2002	(Japan) Fumie Suguri	(Ukraine) Elena Liashenko	(United States) Sasha Cohen	(Japan) Fumie Suguri
2004	(Canada) Cynthia Phaneuf	(Russia) Irina Slutskaya	No competitions prior to 2018	(Canada) Joannie Rochette	No Grand Prix competitions since 2002	(Japan) Shizuka Arakawa	(Russia) Irina Slutskaya	(United States) Angela Nikodinov	(Russia) Irina Slutskaya
2005	(United States) Alissa Czisny	(Russia) Irina Slutskaya	No competitions prior to 2018	(Japan) Mao Asada	No Grand Prix competitions since 2002	(Japan) Yukari Nakano	(Russia) Irina Slutskaya	(Russia) Elena Sokolova	(Japan) Mao Asada
2006	(Canada) Joannie Rochette	(Hungary) Júlia Sebestyén	No competitions prior to 2018	(South Korea) Yuna Kim	No Grand Prix competitions since 2002	(Japan) Mao Asada	(Switzerland) Sarah Meier	(Japan) Miki Ando	(South Korea) Yuna Kim
2007	(Japan) Mao Asada	(South Korea) Yuna Kim	No competitions prior to 2018	(Japan) Mao Asada	No Grand Prix competitions since 2002	(Italy) Carolina Kostner	(South Korea) Yuna Kim	(United States) Kimmie Meissner	(South Korea) Yuna Kim
2008	(Canada) Joannie Rochette	(South Korea) Yuna Kim	No competitions prior to 2018	(Canada) Joannie Rochette	No Grand Prix competitions since 2002	(Japan) Mao Asada	(Italy) Carolina Kostner	(South Korea) Yuna Kim	(Japan) Mao Asada
2009	(Canada) Joannie Rochette	(Japan) Akiko Suzuki	No competitions prior to 2018	(South Korea) Yuna Kim	No Grand Prix competitions since 2002	(Japan) Miki Ando	(Japan) Miki Ando	(South Korea) Yuna Kim	(South Korea) Yuna Kim
2010	(United States) Alissa Czisny	(Japan) Miki Ando	No competitions prior to 2018	(Finland) Kiira Korpi	No Grand Prix competitions since 2002	(Italy) Carolina Kostner	(Japan) Miki Ando	(Japan) Kanako Murakami	(United States) Alissa Czisny
2011	(Russia) Elizaveta Tuktamysheva	(Italy) Carolina Kostner	No competitions prior to 2018	(Russia) Elizaveta Tuktamysheva	No Grand Prix competitions since 2002	(Japan) Akiko Suzuki	(Japan) Mao Asada	(United States) Alissa Czisny	(Italy) Carolina Kostner
2012	(Canada) Kaetlyn Osmond	(Japan) Mao Asada	No competitions prior to 2018	(United States) Ashley Wagner	No Grand Prix competitions since 2002	(Japan) Mao Asada	(Finland) Kiira Korpi	(United States) Ashley Wagner	(Japan) Mao Asada
2013	(Russia) Yulia Lipnitskaya	(Russia) Anna Pogorilaya	No competitions prior to 2018	(United States) Ashley Wagner	No Grand Prix competitions since 2002	(Japan) Mao Asada	(Russia) Yulia Lipnitskaya	(Japan) Mao Asada	(Japan) Mao Asada
2014	(Russia) Anna Pogorilaya	(Russia) Elizaveta Tuktamysheva	No competitions prior to 2018	(Russia) Elena Radionova	No Grand Prix competitions since 2002	(United States) Gracie Gold	(Japan) Rika Hongo	(Russia) Elena Radionova	(Russia) Elizaveta Tuktamysheva
2015	(United States) Ashley Wagner	(Japan) Mao Asada	No competitions prior to 2018	(United States) Gracie Gold	No Grand Prix competitions since 2002	(Japan) Satoko Miyahara	(Russia) Elena Radionova	(Russia) Evgenia Medvedeva	(Russia) Evgenia Medvedeva
2016	(Russia) Evgenia Medvedeva	(Russia) Elena Radionova	No competitions prior to 2018	(Russia) Evgenia Medvedeva	No Grand Prix competitions since 2002	(Russia) Anna Pogorilaya	(Russia) Anna Pogorilaya	(United States) Ashley Wagner	(Russia) Evgenia Medvedeva
2017	(Canada) Kaetlyn Osmond	(Russia) Alina Zagitova	No competitions prior to 2018	(Russia) Alina Zagitova	No Grand Prix competitions since 2002	(Russia) Evgenia Medvedeva	(Russia) Evgenia Medvedeva	(Japan) Satoko Miyahara	(Russia) Alina Zagitova
2018	(Russia) Elizaveta Tuktamysheva	Competition cancelled	(Russia) Alina Zagitova	(Japan) Rika Kihira	No Grand Prix competitions since 2002	(Japan) Rika Kihira	(Russia) Alina Zagitova	(Japan) Satoko Miyahara	(Japan) Rika Kihira
2019	(Russia) Alexandra Trusova	(Russia) Anna Shcherbakova	No competitions held	(Russia) Alena Kostornaia	No Grand Prix competitions since 2002	(Russia) Alena Kostornaia	(Russia) Alexandra Trusova	(Russia) Anna Shcherbakova	(Russia) Alena Kostornaia
2020	Competition cancelled	(China) Chen Hongyi	No competitions held	Competition cancelled	No Grand Prix competitions since 2002	(Japan) Kaori Sakamoto	(Russia) Elizaveta Tuktamysheva	(United States) Mariah Bell	Competition cancelled
2021	(Russia) Kamila Valieva	(Russia) Anna Shcherbakova	No competitions held	(Russia) Anna Shcherbakova	No Grand Prix competitions since 2002	(Japan) Kaori Sakamoto	(Russia) Kamila Valieva	(Russia) Alexandra Trusova	Competition cancelled
2022	(Japan) Rinka Watanabe	(Japan) Mai Mihara	(Japan) Mai Mihara	(Belgium) Loena Hendrickx	No Grand Prix competitions since 2002	(South Korea) Kim Ye-lim	No competitions since 2021	(Japan) Kaori Sakamoto	(Japan) Mai Mihara
2023	(Japan) Kaori Sakamoto	(Japan) Hana Yoshida	(Japan) Kaori Sakamoto	(United States) Isabeau Levito	No Grand Prix competitions since 2002	(United States) Ava Marie Ziegler	No competitions since 2021	(Belgium) Loena Hendrickx	(Japan) Kaori Sakamoto
2024	(Japan) Kaori Sakamoto	(United States) Amber Glenn	(Japan) Hana Yoshida	(United States) Amber Glenn	No Grand Prix competitions since 2002	(Japan) Kaori Sakamoto	No competitions since 2021	(Japan) Wakaba Higuchi	(United States) Amber Glenn
2025	(Japan) Mone Chiba	(United States) Amber Glenn	(Japan) Mone Chiba	(Japan) Ami Nakai	No Grand Prix competitions since 2002	(Japan) Kaori Sakamoto	No competitions since 2021	(United States) Alysa Liu	(United States) Alysa Liu
2026	(Japan) Mao Shimada	(Japan) Mone Chiba		(Japan) Ami Nakai	No Grand Prix competitions since 2002		No competitions since 2021	(Japan) Ami Nakai	

=== Pairs ===
Pairs event champions
Year	Skate Canada International	Cup of China	Grand Prix of Finland	Grand Prix de France	Bofrost Cup on Ice	NHK Trophy	Rostelecom Cup	Skate America	Grand Prix Final
1995	(Russia); Evgenia Shishkova; Vadim Naumov	No competitions prior to 2003	No competitions prior to 2018	(Latvia); Elena Berezhnaya; Oļegs Šļahovs	(Russia); Marina Eltsova; Andrei Bushkov	(Russia); Evgenia Shishkova; Vadim Naumov	No competitions prior to 1996	(Russia); Marina Eltsova; Andrei Bushkov	(Russia); Evgenia Shishkova; Vadim Naumov
1996	(Germany); Mandy Wötzel; Ingo Steuer	No competitions prior to 2003	No competitions prior to 2018	(Russia); Oksana Kazakova; Artur Dmitriev	(Germany); Mandy Wötzel; Ingo Steuer	(United States); Jenni Meno; Todd Sand	(Germany); Mandy Wötzel; Ingo Steuer	(Russia); Oksana Kazakova; Artur Dmitriev	(Germany); Mandy Wötzel; Ingo Steuer
1997	(Russia); Oksana Kazakova; Artur Dmitriev	No competitions prior to 2003	No competitions prior to 2018	(Russia); Elena Berezhnaya; Anton Sikharulidze	(Germany); Mandy Wötzel; Ingo Steuer	(China); Shen Xue; Zhao Hongbo	(Russia); Marina Eltsova; Andrei Bushkov	(Russia); Marina Eltsova; Andrei Bushkov	(Russia); Elena Berezhnaya; Anton Sikharulidze
1998	(China); Shen Xue; Zhao Hongbo	No competitions prior to 2003	No competitions prior to 2018	(France); Sarah Abitbol; Stéphane Bernadis	(Russia); Maria Petrova; Alexei Tikhonov	(Russia); Elena Berezhnaya; Anton Sikharulidze	(Russia); Elena Berezhnaya; Anton Sikharulidze	(Russia); Elena Berezhnaya; Anton Sikharulidze	(China); Shen Xue; Zhao Hongbo
1999	(Russia); Elena Berezhnaya; Anton Sikharulidze	No competitions prior to 2003	No competitions prior to 2018	(France); Sarah Abitbol; Stéphane Bernadis	(Russia); Maria Petrova; Alexei Tikhonov	(Russia); Maria Petrova; Alexei Tikhonov	(Russia); Maria Petrova; Alexei Tikhonov	(Canada); Jamie Salé; David Pelletier	(China); Shen Xue; Zhao Hongbo
2000	(Canada); Jamie Salé; David Pelletier	No competitions prior to 2003	No competitions prior to 2018	(Russia); Elena Berezhnaya; Anton Sikharulidze	(France); Sarah Abitbol; Stéphane Bernadis	(China); Shen Xue; Zhao Hongbo	(Russia); Elena Berezhnaya; Anton Sikharulidze	(Canada); Jamie Salé; David Pelletier	(Canada); Jamie Salé; David Pelletier
2001	(Canada); Jamie Salé; David Pelletier	No competitions prior to 2003	No competitions prior to 2018	(Russia); Elena Berezhnaya; Anton Sikharulidze	(China); Shen Xue; Zhao Hongbo	(China); Shen Xue; Zhao Hongbo	(Russia); Elena Berezhnaya; Anton Sikharulidze	(Canada); Jamie Salé; David Pelletier	(Canada); Jamie Salé; David Pelletier
2002	(Russia); Tatiana Totmianina; Maxim Marinin	No competitions prior to 2003	No competitions prior to 2018	(Russia); Tatiana Totmianina; Maxim Marinin	(China); Shen Xue; Zhao Hongbo	(China); Shen Xue; Zhao Hongbo	(China); Shen Xue; Zhao Hongbo	(Russia); Tatiana Totmianina; Maxim Marinin	(Russia); Tatiana Totmianina; Maxim Marinin
2003	(Russia); Tatiana Totmianina; Maxim Marinin	(China); Shen Xue; Zhao Hongbo	No competitions prior to 2018	(China); Zhang Dan; Zhang Hao	No Grand Prix competitions since 2002	(Russia); Maria Petrova; Alexei Tikhonov	(Russia); Tatiana Totmianina; Maxim Marinin	(China); Pang Qing; Tong Jian	(China); Shen Xue; Zhao Hongbo
2004	(China); Shen Xue; Zhao Hongbo	(China); Shen Xue; Zhao Hongbo	No competitions prior to 2018	(China); Shen Xue; Zhao Hongbo	No Grand Prix competitions since 2002	(Russia); Maria Petrova; Alexei Tikhonov	(China); Zhang Dan; Zhang Hao	(China); Zhang Dan; Zhang Hao	(China); Shen Xue; Zhao Hongbo
2005	(Germany); Aliona Savchenko; Robin Szolkowy	(Russia); Maria Petrova; Alexei Tikhonov	No competitions prior to 2018	(Russia); Tatiana Totmianina; Maxim Marinin	No Grand Prix competitions since 2002	(China); Zhang Dan; Zhang Hao	(Russia); Tatiana Totmianina; Maxim Marinin	(China); Zhang Dan; Zhang Hao	(Russia); Tatiana Totmianina; Maxim Marinin
2006	(China); Zhang Dan; Zhang Hao	(China); Shen Xue; Zhao Hongbo	No competitions prior to 2018	(Russia); Maria Petrova; Alexei Tikhonov	No Grand Prix competitions since 2002	(China); Shen Xue; Zhao Hongbo	(Germany); Aliona Savchenko; Robin Szolkowy	(United States); Rena Inoue; John Baldwin	(China); Shen Xue; Zhao Hongbo
2007	(Germany); Aliona Savchenko; Robin Szolkowy	(China); Pang Qing; Tong Jian	No competitions prior to 2018	(China); Zhang Dan; Zhang Hao	No Grand Prix competitions since 2002	(Germany); Aliona Savchenko; Robin Szolkowy	(China); Zhang Dan; Zhang Hao	(Canada); Jessica Dubé; Bryce Davison	(Germany); Aliona Savchenko; Robin Szolkowy
2008	(Russia); Yuko Kavaguti; Alexander Smirnov	(China); Zhang Dan; Zhang Hao	No competitions prior to 2018	(Germany); Aliona Savchenko; Robin Szolkowy	No Grand Prix competitions since 2002	(China); Pang Qing; Tong Jian	(China); Zhang Dan; Zhang Hao	(Germany); Aliona Savchenko; Robin Szolkowy	(China); Pang Qing; Tong Jian
2009	(Germany); Aliona Savchenko; Robin Szolkowy	(China); Shen Xue; Zhao Hongbo	No competitions prior to 2018	(Russia); Maria Mukhortova; Maxim Trankov	No Grand Prix competitions since 2002	(China); Pang Qing; Tong Jian	(China); Pang Qing; Tong Jian	(China); Shen Xue; Zhao Hongbo	(China); Shen Xue; Zhao Hongbo
2010	(Russia); Lubov Iliushechkina; Nodari Maisuradze	(China); Pang Qing; Tong Jian	No competitions prior to 2018	(Germany); Aliona Savchenko; Robin Szolkowy	No Grand Prix competitions since 2002	(China); Pang Qing; Tong Jian	(Russia); Yuko Kavaguti; Alexander Smirnov	(Germany); Aliona Savchenko; Robin Szolkowy	(Germany); Aliona Savchenko; Robin Szolkowy
2011	(Russia); Tatiana Volosozhar; Maxim Trankov	(Russia); Yuko Kavaguti; Alexander Smirnov	No competitions prior to 2018	(Russia); Tatiana Volosozhar; Maxim Trankov	No Grand Prix competitions since 2002	(Russia); Yuko Kavaguti; Alexander Smirnov	(Germany); Aliona Savchenko; Robin Szolkowy	(Germany); Aliona Savchenko; Robin Szolkowy	(Germany); Aliona Savchenko; Robin Szolkowy
2012	(Germany); Aliona Savchenko; Robin Szolkowy	(China); Pang Qing; Tong Jian	No competitions prior to 2018	(Russia); Yuko Kavaguti; Alexander Smirnov	No Grand Prix competitions since 2002	(Russia); Vera Bazarova; Yuri Larionov	(Russia); Tatiana Volosozhar; Maxim Trankov	(Russia); Tatiana Volosozhar; Maxim Trankov	(Russia); Tatiana Volosozhar; Maxim Trankov
2013	(Italy); Stefania Berton; Ondřej Hotárek	(Germany); Aliona Savchenko; Robin Szolkowy	No competitions prior to 2018	(China); Pang Qing; Tong Jian	No Grand Prix competitions since 2002	(Russia); Tatiana Volosozhar; Maxim Trankov	(Germany); Aliona Savchenko; Robin Szolkowy	(Russia); Tatiana Volosozhar; Maxim Trankov	(Germany); Aliona Savchenko; Robin Szolkowy
2014	(Canada); Meagan Duhamel; Eric Radford	(China); Peng Cheng; Zhang Hao	No competitions prior to 2018	(Russia); Ksenia Stolbova; Fedor Klimov	No Grand Prix competitions since 2002	(Canada); Meagan Duhamel; Eric Radford	(Russia); Ksenia Stolbova; Fedor Klimov	(Russia); Yuko Kavaguti; Alexander Smirnov	(Canada); Meagan Duhamel; Eric Radford
2015	(Canada); Meagan Duhamel; Eric Radford	(Russia); Yuko Kavaguti; Alexander Smirnov	No competitions prior to 2018	(Russia); Tatiana Volosozhar; Maxim Trankov	No Grand Prix competitions since 2002	(Canada); Meagan Duhamel; Eric Radford	(Russia); Ksenia Stolbova; Fedor Klimov	(China); Sui Wenjing; Han Cong	(Russia); Ksenia Stolbova; Fedor Klimov
2016	(Canada); Meagan Duhamel; Eric Radford	(China); Yu Xiaoyu; Zhang Hao	No competitions prior to 2018	(Germany); Aliona Savchenko; Bruno Massot	No Grand Prix competitions since 2002	(Canada); Meagan Duhamel; Eric Radford	(Germany); Aliona Savchenko; Bruno Massot	(Canada); Julianne Séguin; Charlie Bilodeau	(Russia); Evgenia Tarasova; Vladimir Morozov
2017	(Canada); Meagan Duhamel; Eric Radford	(China); Sui Wenjing; Han Cong	No competitions prior to 2018	(Russia); Evgenia Tarasova; Vladimir Morozov	No Grand Prix competitions since 2002	(China); Sui Wenjing; Han Cong	(Russia); Evgenia Tarasova; Vladimir Morozov	(Germany); Aliona Savchenko; Bruno Massot	(Germany); Aliona Savchenko; Bruno Massot
2018	(France); Vanessa James; Morgan Ciprès	Competition cancelled	(Russia); Natalia Zabiiako; Alexander Enbert	(France); Vanessa James; Morgan Ciprès	No Grand Prix competitions since 2002	(Russia); Natalia Zabiiako; Alexander Enbert	(Russia); Evgenia Tarasova; Vladimir Morozov	(Russia); Evgenia Tarasova; Vladimir Morozov	(France); Vanessa James; Morgan Ciprès
2019	(Russia); Aleksandra Boikova; Dmitrii Kozlovskii	(China); Sui Wenjing; Han Cong	No competitions held	(Russia); Anastasia Mishina; Aleksandr Galliamov	No Grand Prix competitions since 2002	(China); Sui Wenjing; Han Cong	(Russia); Aleksandra Boikova; Dmitrii Kozlovskii	(China); Peng Cheng; Jin Yang	(China); Sui Wenjing; Han Cong
2020	Competition cancelled	(China); Peng Cheng; Jin Yang	No competitions held	Competition cancelled	No Grand Prix competitions since 2002	No pairs competition held	(Russia); Aleksandra Boikova; Dmitrii Kozlovskii	(United States); Alexa Scimeca Knierim; Brandon Frazier	Competition cancelled
2021	(China); Sui Wenjing; Han Cong	(China); Sui Wenjing; Han Cong	No competitions held	(Russia); Aleksandra Boikova; Dmitrii Kozlovskii	No Grand Prix competitions since 2002	(Russia); Anastasia Mishina; Aleksandr Galliamov	(Russia); Anastasia Mishina; Aleksandr Galliamov	(Russia); Evgenia Tarasova; Vladimir Morozov	Competition cancelled
2022	(Japan); Riku Miura; Ryuichi Kihara	(United States); Alexa Knierim; Brandon Frazier	(Italy); Rebecca Ghilardi; Filippo Ambrosini	(Canada); Deanna Stellato-Dudek; Maxime Deschamps	No Grand Prix competitions since 2002	(Japan); Riku Miura; Ryuichi Kihara	No competitions since 2021	(United States); Alexa Knierim; Brandon Frazier	(Japan); Riku Miura; Ryuichi Kihara
2023	(Canada); Deanna Stellato-Dudek; Maxime Deschamps	(Canada); Deanna Stellato-Dudek; Maxime Deschamps	(Germany); Minerva Fabienne Hase; Nikita Volodin	(Canada); Lia Pereira; Trennt Michaud	No Grand Prix competitions since 2002	(Germany); Minerva Fabienne Hase; Nikita Volodin	No competitions since 2021	(Germany); Annika Hocke; Robert Kunkel	(Germany); Minerva Fabienne Hase; Nikita Volodin
2024	(Canada); Deanna Stellato-Dudek; Maxime Deschamps	(Italy); Sara Conti; Niccolò Macii	(Canada); Deanna Stellato-Dudek; Maxime Deschamps	(Germany); Minerva Fabienne Hase; Nikita Volodin	No Grand Prix competitions since 2002	(Georgia (country)); Anastasiia Metelkina; Luka Berulava	No competitions since 2021	(Japan); Riku Miura; Ryuichi Kihara	(Germany); Minerva Fabienne Hase; Nikita Volodin
2025	(Canada); Deanna Stellato-Dudek; Maxime Deschamps	(Georgia (country)); Anastasiia Metelkina; Luka Berulava	(Germany); Minerva Fabienne Hase; Nikita Volodin	(Japan); Riku Miura; Ryuichi Kihara	No Grand Prix competitions since 2002	(Italy); Sara Conti; Niccolò Macii	No competitions since 2021	(Japan); Riku Miura; Ryuichi Kihara	(Japan); Riku Miura; Ryuichi Kihara
2026	(Canada); Lia Pereira; Trennt Michaud	(Individual Neutral Athletes); Anastasia Mishina; Aleksandr Galliamov		(Georgia (country)); Anastasiia Metelkina; Luka Berulava	No Grand Prix competitions since 2002		No competitions since 2021	(Germany); Minerva Fabienne Hase; Nikita Volodin	

=== Ice dance ===
Ice dance event champions
Year	Skate Canada International	Cup of China	Grand Prix of Finland	Grand Prix de France	Bofrost Cup on Ice	NHK Trophy	Rostelecom Cup	Skate America	Grand Prix Final
1995	(Canada); Shae-Lynn Bourne; Victor Kraatz	No competitions prior to 2003	No competitions prior to 2018	(Russia); Oksana Grishuk; Evgeni Platov	(Russia); Anjelika Krylova; Oleg Ovsyannikov	(France); Marina Anissina; Gwendal Peizerat	No competitions prior to 1996	(Russia); Oksana Grishuk; Evgeni Platov	(Russia); Oksana Grishuk; Evgeni Platov
1996	(Canada); Shae-Lynn Bourne; Victor Kraatz	No competitions prior to 2003	No competitions prior to 2018	(France); Marina Anissina; Gwendal Peizerat	(Russia); Anjelika Krylova; Oleg Ovsyannikov	(France); Sophie Moniotte; Pascal Lavanchy	(Russia); Anjelika Krylova; Oleg Ovsyannikov	(Russia); Anjelika Krylova; Oleg Ovsyannikov	(Canada); Shae-Lynn Bourne; Victor Kraatz
1997	(Canada); Shae-Lynn Bourne; Victor Kraatz	No competitions prior to 2003	No competitions prior to 2018	(Russia); Oksana Grishuk; Pasha Grishuk	(Russia); Anjelika Krylova; Oleg Ovsyannikov	(Russia); Oksana Grishuk; Pasha Grishuk	(Russia); Anjelika Krylova; Oleg Ovsyannikov	(United States); Elizabeth Punsalan; Jerod Swallow	(Russia); Oksana Grishuk; Pasha Grishuk
1998	(Canada); Shae-Lynn Bourne; Victor Kraatz	No competitions prior to 2003	No competitions prior to 2018	(France); Marina Anissina; Gwendal Peizerat	(Russia); Anjelika Krylova; Oleg Ovsyannikov	(France); Marina Anissina; Gwendal Peizerat	(Russia); Anjelika Krylova; Oleg Ovsyannikov	(France); Marina Anissina; Gwendal Peizerat	(Russia); Anjelika Krylova; Oleg Ovsyannikov
1999	(Lithuania); Margarita Drobiazko; Povilas Vanagas	No competitions prior to 2003	No competitions prior to 2018	(France); Marina Anissina; Gwendal Peizerat	(Canada); Shae-Lynn Bourne; Victor Kraatz	(France); Marina Anissina; Gwendal Peizerat	(Italy); Barbara Fusar-Poli; Maurizio Margaglio	(Italy); Barbara Fusar-Poli; Maurizio Margaglio	(France); Marina Anissina; Gwendal Peizerat
2000	(France); Marina Anissina; Gwendal Peizerat	No competitions prior to 2003	No competitions prior to 2018	(France); Marina Anissina; Gwendal Peizerat	(Italy); Barbara Fusar-Poli; Maurizio Margaglio	(France); Marina Anissina; Gwendal Peizerat	(Italy); Barbara Fusar-Poli; Maurizio Margaglio	(Italy); Barbara Fusar-Poli; Maurizio Margaglio	(Italy); Barbara Fusar-Poli; Maurizio Margaglio
2001	(Canada); Shae-Lynn Bourne; Victor Kraatz	No competitions prior to 2003	No competitions prior to 2018	(France); Marina Anissina; Gwendal Peizerat	(Italy); Barbara Fusar-Poli; Maurizio Margaglio	(France); Marina Anissina; Gwendal Peizerat	(Italy); Barbara Fusar-Poli; Maurizio Margaglio	(Canada); Shae-Lynn Bourne; Victor Kraatz	(Canada); Shae-Lynn Bourne; Victor Kraatz
2002	(Ukraine); Elena Grushina; Ruslan Goncharov	No competitions prior to 2003	No competitions prior to 2018	(Ukraine); Elena Grushina; Ruslan Goncharov	(Bulgaria); Albena Denkova; Maxim Staviski	(Russia); Irina Lobacheva; Ilia Averbukh	(Russia); Irina Lobacheva; Ilia Averbukh	(Ukraine); Elena Grushina; Ruslan Goncharov	(Russia); Irina Lobacheva; Ilia Averbukh
2003	(Russia); Tatiana Navka; Roman Kostomarov	(Russia); Tatiana Navka; Roman Kostomarov	No competitions prior to 2018	(Bulgaria); Albena Denkova; Maxim Staviski	No Grand Prix competitions since 2002	(Bulgaria); Albena Denkova; Maxim Staviski	(Russia); Tatiana Navka; Roman Kostomarov	(United States); Tanith Belbin; Benjamin Agosto	(Russia); Tatiana Navka; Roman Kostomarov
2004	(Bulgaria); Albena Denkova; Maxim Staviski	(United States); Tanith Belbin; Benjamin Agosto	No competitions prior to 2018	(Russia); Tatiana Navka; Roman Kostomarov	No Grand Prix competitions since 2002	(Bulgaria); Albena Denkova; Maxim Staviski	(Russia); Tatiana Navka; Roman Kostomarov	(United States); Tanith Belbin; Benjamin Agosto	(Russia); Tatiana Navka; Roman Kostomarov
2005	(Canada); Marie-France Dubreuil; Patrice Lauzon	(Russia); Tatiana Navka; Roman Kostomarov	No competitions prior to 2018	(Ukraine); Elena Grushina; Ruslan Goncharov	No Grand Prix competitions since 2002	(Canada); Marie-France Dubreuil; Patrice Lauzon	(Russia); Tatiana Navka; Roman Kostomarov	(United States); Tanith Belbin; Benjamin Agosto	(Russia); Tatiana Navka; Roman Kostomarov
2006	(Canada); Marie-France Dubreuil; Patrice Lauzon	(Russia); Oksana Domnina; Maxim Shabalin	No competitions prior to 2018	(Bulgaria); Albena Denkova; Maxim Staviski	No Grand Prix competitions since 2002	(Canada); Marie-France Dubreuil; Patrice Lauzon	(United States); Tanith Belbin; Benjamin Agosto	(Bulgaria); Albena Denkova; Maxim Staviski	(Bulgaria); Albena Denkova; Maxim Staviski
2007	(Canada); Tessa Virtue; Scott Moir	(United States); Tanith Belbin; Benjamin Agosto	No competitions prior to 2018	(France); Isabelle Delobel; Olivier Schoenfelder	No Grand Prix competitions since 2002	(France); Isabelle Delobel; Olivier Schoenfelder	(Russia); Oksana Domnina; Maxim Shabalin	(United States); Tanith Belbin; Benjamin Agosto	(Russia); Oksana Domnina; Maxim Shabalin
2008	(United States); Meryl Davis; Charlie White	(Russia); Oksana Domnina; Maxim Shabalin	No competitions prior to 2018	(France); Isabelle Delobel; Olivier Schoenfelder	No Grand Prix competitions since 2002	(Italy); Federica Faiella; Massimo Scali	(Russia); Jana Khokhlova; Sergei Novitski	(France); Isabelle Delobel; Olivier Schoenfelder	(France); Isabelle Delobel; Olivier Schoenfelder
2009	(Canada); Tessa Virtue; Scott Moir	(United States); Tanith Belbin; Benjamin Agosto	No competitions prior to 2018	(Canada); Tessa Virtue; Scott Moir	No Grand Prix competitions since 2002	(United States); Meryl Davis; Charlie White	(United States); Meryl Davis; Charlie White	(United States); Tanith Belbin; Benjamin Agosto	(United States); Meryl Davis; Charlie White
2010	(Canada); Vanessa Crone; Paul Poirier	(France); Nathalie Péchalat; Fabian Bourzat	No competitions prior to 2018	(France); Nathalie Péchalat; Fabian Bourzat	No Grand Prix competitions since 2002	(United States); Meryl Davis; Charlie White	(Russia); Ekaterina Bobrova; Dmitri Soloviev	(United States); Meryl Davis; Charlie White	(United States); Meryl Davis; Charlie White
2011	(Canada); Tessa Virtue; Scott Moir	(Russia); Ekaterina Bobrova; Dmitri Soloviev	No competitions prior to 2018	(Canada); Tessa Virtue; Scott Moir	No Grand Prix competitions since 2002	(United States); Maia Shibutani; Alex Shibutani	(United States); Meryl Davis; Charlie White	(United States); Meryl Davis; Charlie White	(United States); Meryl Davis; Charlie White
2012	(Canada); Tessa Virtue; Scott Moir	(France); Nathalie Péchalat; Fabian Bourzat	No competitions prior to 2018	(France); Nathalie Péchalat; Fabian Bourzat	No Grand Prix competitions since 2002	(United States); Meryl Davis; Charlie White	(Canada); Tessa Virtue; Scott Moir	(United States); Meryl Davis; Charlie White	(United States); Meryl Davis; Charlie White
2013	(Canada); Tessa Virtue; Scott Moir	(France); Nathalie Péchalat; Fabian Bourzat	No competitions prior to 2018	(Canada); Tessa Virtue; Scott Moir	No Grand Prix competitions since 2002	(United States); Meryl Davis; Charlie White	(Russia); Ekaterina Bobrova; Dmitri Soloviev	(United States); Meryl Davis; Charlie White	(United States); Meryl Davis; Charlie White
2014	(Canada); Kaitlyn Weaver; Andrew Poje	(France); Gabriella Papadakis; Guillaume Cizeron	No competitions prior to 2018	(France); Gabriella Papadakis; Guillaume Cizeron	No Grand Prix competitions since 2002	(Canada); Kaitlyn Weaver; Andrew Poje	(United States); Madison Chock; Evan Bates	(United States); Madison Chock; Evan Bates	(Canada); Kaitlyn Weaver; Andrew Poje
2015	(Canada); Kaitlyn Weaver; Andrew Poje	(Italy); Anna Cappellini; Luca Lanotte	No competitions prior to 2018	(United States); Madison Hubbell; Zachary Donohue	No Grand Prix competitions since 2002	(United States); Maia Shibutani; Alex Shibutani	(Canada); Kaitlyn Weaver; Andrew Poje	(United States); Madison Chock; Evan Bates	(Canada); Kaitlyn Weaver; Andrew Poje
2016	(Canada); Tessa Virtue; Scott Moir	(United States); Maia Shibutani; Alex Shibutani	No competitions prior to 2018	(France); Gabriella Papadakis; Guillaume Cizeron	No Grand Prix competitions since 2002	(Canada); Tessa Virtue; Scott Moir	(Russia); Ekaterina Bobrova; Dmitri Soloviev	(United States); Maia Shibutani; Alex Shibutani	(Canada); Tessa Virtue; Scott Moir
2017	(Canada); Tessa Virtue; Scott Moir	(France); Gabriella Papadakis; Guillaume Cizeron	No competitions prior to 2018	(France); Gabriella Papadakis; Guillaume Cizeron	No Grand Prix competitions since 2002	(Canada); Tessa Virtue; Scott Moir	(United States); Maia Shibutani; Alex Shibutani	(United States); Maia Shibutani; Alex Shibutani	(France); Gabriella Papadakis; Guillaume Cizeron
2018	(United States); Madison Hubbell; Zachary Donohue	Competition cancelled	(Russia); Alexandra Stepanova; Ivan Bukin	(France); Gabriella Papadakis; Guillaume Cizeron	No Grand Prix competitions since 2002	(United States); Kaitlin Hawayek; Jean-Luc Baker	(Russia); Alexandra Stepanova; Ivan Bukin	(United States); Madison Hubbell; Zachary Donohue	(United States); Madison Hubbell; Zachary Donohue
2019	(Canada); Piper Gilles; Paul Poirier	(Russia); Victoria Sinitsina; Nikita Katsalapov	No competitions held	(France); Gabriella Papadakis; Guillaume Cizeron	No Grand Prix competitions since 2002	(France); Gabriella Papadakis; Guillaume Cizeron	(Russia); Victoria Sinitsina; Nikita Katsalapov	(United States); Madison Hubbell; Zachary Donohue	(France); Gabriella Papadakis; Guillaume Cizeron
2020	Competition cancelled	(China); Wang Shiyue; Liu Xinyu	No competitions held	Competition cancelled	No Grand Prix competitions since 2002	(Japan); Misato Komatsubara; Tim Koleto	(Russia); Victoria Sinitsina; Nikita Katsalapov	(United States); Madison Hubbell; Zachary Donohue	Competition cancelled
2021	(Canada); Piper Gilles; Paul Poirier	(France); Gabriella Papadakis; Guillaume Cizeron	No competitions held	(France); Gabriella Papadakis; Guillaume Cizeron	No Grand Prix competitions since 2002	(Russia); Victoria Sinitsina; Nikita Katsalapov	(Russia); Victoria Sinitsina; Nikita Katsalapov	(United States); Madison Hubbell; Zachary Donohue	Competition cancelled
2022	(Canada); Piper Gilles; Paul Poirier	(Italy); Charlène Guignard; Marco Fabbri	(Canada); Piper Gilles; Paul Poirier	(Italy); Charlène Guignard; Marco Fabbri	No Grand Prix competitions since 2002	(Canada); Laurence Fournier Beaudry; Nikolaj Sørensen	No competitions since 2021	(United States); Madison Chock; Evan Bates	(Canada); Piper Gilles; Paul Poirier
2023	(Canada); Piper Gilles; Paul Poirier	(Canada); Piper Gilles; Paul Poirier	(United States); Madison Chock; Evan Bates	(Italy); Charlène Guignard; Marco Fabbri	No Grand Prix competitions since 2002	(United Kingdom); Lilah Fear; Lewis Gibson	No competitions since 2021	(United States); Madison Chock; Evan Bates	(United States); Madison Chock; Evan Bates
2024	(Canada); Piper Gilles; Paul Poirier	(Italy); Charlène Guignard; Marco Fabbri	(United Kingdom); Lilah Fear; Lewis Gibson	(France); Evgenia Lopareva; Geoffrey Brissaud	No Grand Prix competitions since 2002	(United States); Madison Chock; Evan Bates	No competitions since 2021	(United Kingdom); Lilah Fear; Lewis Gibson	(United States); Madison Chock; Evan Bates
2025	(Canada); Piper Gilles; Paul Poirier	(United States); Madison Chock; Evan Bates	(France); Laurence Fournier Beaudry; Guillaume Cizeron	(France); Laurence Fournier Beaudry; Guillaume Cizeron	No Grand Prix competitions since 2002	(United Kingdom); Lilah Fear; Lewis Gibson	No competitions since 2021	(United States); Madison Chock; Evan Bates	(United States); Madison Chock; Evan Bates
2026	(United Kingdom); Lilah Fear; Lewis Gibson	(United Kingdom); Lilah Fear; Lewis Gibson		(France); Laurence Fournier Beaudry; Guillaume Cizeron	No Grand Prix competitions since 2002		No competitions since 2021	(United States); Emilea Zingas; Vadym Kolesnik	

== See also ==
- ISU Grand Prix of Figure Skating cumulative medal count
