= 1995–96 Champions Series Final =

- Type: Champions Series
- Date: February 23 – 25, 1996
- Season: 1995–96
- Location: Paris, France

Champions
- Men's singles: (Russia) Alexei Urmanov
- Ladies' singles: (United States) Michelle Kwan
- Pairs: (Russia) Evgenia Shishkova / Vadim Naumov
- Ice dance: (Russia) Oksana Grishuk / Evgeni Platov
- Next: 1996–97 Champions Series Final
- Previous GP: 1995 NHK Trophy

The 1995–96 ISU Champions Series Final was an elite figure skating competition held in Paris, France from February 23 through 25, 1996. Medals were awarded in men's singles, ladies' singles, pair skating, and ice dancing.

The Champions Series Final was the culminating event of the ISU Champions Series, which consisted of Skate America, Skate Canada International, Nations Cup, Trophée de France, and NHK Trophy. The top six skaters from each discipline competed in the final.

== Results ==
=== Men ===
Rank	Name	Nation	TFP	SP	FS
1	Alexei Urmanov	Russia	1.5	1	1
2	Elvis Stojko	Canada	3.5	3	2
3	Éric Millot	France	4.0	2	3
4	Ilia Kulik	Russia	6.5	5	4
5	Todd Eldredge	United States	8.0	6	5
6	Viacheslav Zagorodniuk	Ukraine	8.0	4	6

=== Ladies ===
Rank	Name	Nation	TFP	SP	FS
1	Michelle Kwan	United States	3.0	4	1
2	Irina Slutskaya	Russia	3.5	3	2
3	Josée Chouinard	Canada	4.0	2	3
4	Chen Lu	China	5.5	1	5
5	Hanae Yokoya	Japan	7.0	7	4
6	Olga Markova	Russia	8.5	5	6
7	Maria Butyrskaya	Russia	10.0	6	7

=== Pairs ===
Rank	Name	Nation	TFP	SP	FS
1	Evgenia Shishkova / Vadim Naumov	Russia	1.5	1	1
2	Marina Eltsova / Andrei Bushkov	Russia	4.0	4	2
3	Mandy Wötzel / Ingo Steuer	Germany	4.0	2	3
4	Jenni Meno / Todd Sand	United States	5.5	3	4

=== Ice dancing ===
Rank	Name	Nation	TFP	CD	OD	FD
1	Oksana Grishuk / Evgeni Platov	Russia	2.0	1	1	1
2	Anjelika Krylova / Oleg Ovsyannikov	Russia	4.0	2	2	2
3	Marina Anissina / Gwendal Peizerat	France	6.6	3	4	3
4	Shae-Lynn Bourne / Victor Kraatz	Canada	7.4	4	3	4
