= 1994 World Figure Skating Championships =

Annual figure skating competition held in 1994

- Type: ISU Championship
- Date: March 20 – 27
- Season: 1993–94
- Location: Chiba, Japan
- Venue: Makuhari Messe

Champions
- Men's singles: (Canada) Elvis Stojko
- Ladies' singles: (Japan) Yuka Sato
- Pairs: (Russia) Evgenia Shishkova / Vadim Naumov
- Ice dance: (Russia) Oksana Grishuk / Evgeni Platov
- Previous: 1993 World Championships
- Next: 1995 World Championships

The 1994 World Figure Skating Championships were held at the Makuhari Messe Arena in Chiba, Japan from March 20 to 27. Medals were awarded in men's singles, ladies' singles, pair skating, and ice dancing.

== Medal tables ==
=== Medalists ===
Discipline	Gold	Silver	Bronze
Men	(Canada) Elvis Stojko	(France) Philippe Candeloro	(Ukraine) Viacheslav Zagorodniuk
Ladies	(Japan) Yuka Sato	(France) Surya Bonaly	(Germany) Tanja Szewczenko
Pair skating	(Russia) Evgenia Shishkova / Vadim Naumov	(Canada) Isabelle Brasseur / Lloyd Eisler	(Russia) Marina Eltsova / Andrei Bushkov
Ice dancing	(Russia) Oksana Grishuk / Evgeni Platov	(France) Sophie Moniotte / Pascal Lavanchy	(Finland) Susanna Rahkamo / Petri Kokko

=== Medals by country ===
Rank	Nation	Gold	Silver	Bronze	Total
1	Russia (RUS)	2	0	1	3
2	Canada (CAN)	1	1	0	2
3	Japan (JPN)	1	0	0	1
4	France (FRA)	0	3	0	3
5	Finland (FIN)	0	0	1	1
5	Germany (GER)	0	0	1	1
5	Ukraine (UKR)	0	0	1	1
Totals (7 entries)		4	4	4	12

== Results ==
=== Men ===
Rank	Name	Nation	TFP	QA	QB	SP	FS
1	Elvis Stojko	Canada	1.5	1		1	1
2	Philippe Candeloro	France	3.0	2		2	2
3	Viacheslav Zagorodniuk	Ukraine	4.5		2	3	3
4	Alexei Urmanov	Russia	6.0		1	4	4
5	Éric Millot	France	8.5	3		5	6
6	Masakazu Kagiyama	Japan	9.5		6	9	5
7	Scott Davis	United States	11.0		3	8	7
8	Sébastien Britten	Canada	14.0		4	12	8
9	Igor Pashkevich	Russia	14.0	7		10	9
10	Steven Cousins	United Kingdom	14.5		8	7	11
11	Andrejs Vlascenko	Latvia	15.5	5		11	10
12	Oleg Tataurov	Russia	18.5		5	13	12
13	Aren Nielsen	United States	19.0	9		6	16
14	Michael Shmerkin	Israel	20.0		7	14	13
15	Marcus Christensen	Canada	22.0	6		16	14
16	Zsolt Kerekes	Hungary	23.5		10	17	15
17	Michael Tyllesen	Denmark	25.5	4		15	18
18	Ronny Winkler	Germany	26.0		11	18	17
19	Besarion Tsintsadze	Georgia	30.0	10		22	19
20	Jung Sung-il	South Korea	31.0	8		20	21
21	David Liu	Chinese Taipei	31.5		9	23	20
22	Stephen Carr	Australia	33.5		12	21	23
23	Markus Leminen	Finland	33.5	12		19	24
24	Fumihiro Oikawa	Japan	34.0	11		24	22
Short program not reached
25	Igor Lutikov	Azerbaijan		13			
25	Hristo Turlakov	Bulgaria			13		
27	Alexander Murashko	Belarus		14			
27	Marius-Cristian Negrea	Romania			14		
29	Dino Quattrocecere	South Africa		15			
29	Clifford Retamar	Spain			15		
31	Fabrizio Garattoni	Italy		16			
31	Zbigniew Komorowski	Poland			16		
33	Zhang Min	China		17			
33	Margus Hernits	Estonia			17		
35	Rastislav Vnučko	Slovakia		18			
35	Yuri Litvinov	Kazakhstan			18		
37	Emrah Polatoglu	Turkey		19			
37	Ricardo Olavarrieta	Mexico			19		
39	Tomislav Čižmešija	Croatia		20			
39	Vaidotas Juraitis	Lithuania			20		
41	Alexandros Kyperos	Greece		21			

=== Ladies ===
Rank	Name	Nation	TFP	QA	QB	SP	FS
1	Yuka Sato	Japan	1.5	1		1	1
2	Surya Bonaly	France	3.0	2		2	2
3	Tanja Szewczenko	Germany	5.0	3		4	3
4	Marina Kielmann	Germany	6.5		3	5	4
5	Josée Chouinard	Canada	6.5		1	3	5
6	Elena Liashenko	Ukraine	9.0	6		6	6
7	Marie-Pierre Leray	France	13.0		10	12	7
8	Michelle Kwan	United States	13.5	5		11	8
9	Susan Humphreys	Canada	14.0	7		10	9
10	Olga Markova	Russia	14.5	4		7	11
11	Mila Kajas	Finland	17.0		4	8	13
12	Krisztina Czakó	Hungary	19.0		5	18	10
13	Rena Inoue	Japan	19.5		6	15	12
14	Nathalie Krieg	Switzerland	21.5		9	13	15
15	Anna Rechnio	Poland	21.5		7	9	17
16	Lenka Kulovaná	Czech Republic	22.5	10		17	14
17	Lyudmyla Ivanova	Ukraine	23.0	8		14	16
18	Charlene Von Saher	United Kingdom	26.0	11		16	18
19	Alice Sue Claeys	Belgium	30.0		11	22	19
20	Viktoria Dimitrova	Bulgaria	30.5	9		21	20
21	Tatiana Malinina	Uzbekistan	30.5		8	19	21
22	Liu Ying	China	33.0		12	20	23
23	Inna Zayets	Ukraine	33.5	12		23	22
WD	Chen Lu	China			2		
Short program not reached
25	Silvia Fontana	Italy		13			
25	Nicole Bobek	United States			13		
27	Marta Andrade	Spain		14			
27	Laëtitia Hubert	France			14		
29	Kateřina Beránková	Czech Republic		15			
29	Julia Vorobieva	Azerbaijan			15		
31	Lily Lyoonjung Lee	South Korea		16			
31	Olga Vassilieva	Estonia			16		
33	Alma Lepina	Latvia		17			
33	Tamara Panjkret	Croatia			17		
35	Zhao Guona	China		18			
35	Ingrida Zenkeviciute	Lithuania			18		
37	Valentina Gazeleridi	Kazakhstan		19			
37	Claire Auret	South Africa			19		
39	Miriam Manzano	Australia		20			
39	Lefki Terzaki	Greece			20		
41	Sandra Brajdic	Yugoslavia		21			
41	Zaneta Stefanikova	Slovakia			21		

Following the ladies event, Surya Bonaly, the silver medalist, protested her second place finish during the medal ceremony. First, by refusing to stand on the podium and then, stripping her medal off of her neck after being presented it.

=== Pairs ===
Rank	Name	Nation	TFP	SP	FS
1	Evgenia Shishkova / Vadim Naumov	Russia	1.5	1	1
2	Isabelle Brasseur / Lloyd Eisler	Canada	3.0	2	2
3	Marina Eltsova / Andrei Bushkov	Russia	4.5	3	3
4	Mandy Wötzel / Ingo Steuer	Germany	6.5	5	4
5	Radka Kovaříková / René Novotný	Czech Republic	7.0	4	5
6	Jenni Meno / Todd Sand	United States	11.0	6	8
7	Elena Berezhnaya / Oleg Shliakhov	Latvia	11.5	11	6
8	Maria Petrova / Anton Sikharulidze	Russia	12.0	10	7
9	Peggy Schwarz / Alexander König	Germany	12.5	7	9
10	Danielle Carr / Stephen Carr	Australia	15.0	8	11
11	Kristy Sargeant / Kris Wirtz	Canada	16.0	8	12
12	Kyoko Ina / Jason Dungjen	United States	17.0	14	10
13	Natalia Krestianinova / Alexei Torchinski	Azerbaijan	19.0	12	13
14	Anuschka Gläser / Axel Rauschenbach	Germany	21.5	15	14
15	Yukiko Kawasaki / Alexei Tikhonov	Japan	21.5	13	15
16	Jamie Salé / Jason Turner	Canada	25.0	18	16
17	Karen Courtland / Todd Reynolds	United States	25.0	16	17
18	Marina Khalturina / Andrei Kriukov	Kazakhstan	27.5	17	19
19	Line Haddad / Sylvain Privé	France	28.0	20	18
20	Olena Bilousivska / Ihor Maliar	Ukraine	29.5	19	20
21	Shen Xue / Zhao Hongbo	China	32.5	23	21
22	Marta Głuchowska / Mariusz Siudek	Poland	33.0	22	22
23	Marta Andrella / Dmitry Kaplun	Italy	34.5	21	24
24	Elena Grigoreva / Sergei Sheiko	Belarus	35.0	24	23
Free skating not reached
25	Dana Mednick / Jason Briggs	United Kingdom		25	
26	Claire Auret / Christoff Van Rensburg	South Africa		26	
27	Nigora Karabaeva / Evgeny Sviridov	Uzbekistan		27	
28	Poon Hoi-san / Cheung Wai-tung	Hong Kong		28	

=== Ice dancing ===
Rank	Name	Nation	TFP	CD1	CD2	OD	FD
1	Oksana Grishuk / Evgeni Platov	Russia	2.0	1	1	1	1
2	Sophie Moniotte / Pascal Lavanchy	France	4.0	2	2	2	2
3	Susanna Rahkamo / Petri Kokko	Finland	6.0	3	3	3	3
4	Irina Romanova / Igor Yaroshenko	Ukraine	8.2	4	5	4	4
5	Tatiana Navka / Samvel Gezalian	Belarus	10.4	6	6	5	5
6	Shae-Lynn Bourne / Victor Kraatz	Canada	12.8	9	7	6	6
7	Jennifer Goolsbee / Hendryk Schamberger	Germany	14.4	7	9	7	7
8	Kateřina Mrázová / Martin Šimeček	Czech Republic	16.0	8	8	8	8
9	Margarita Drobiazko / Povilas Vanagas	Lithuania	18.6	10	11	9	9
10	Marina Anissina / Gwendal Peizerat	France	20.2	11	10	10	10
11	Aliki Stergiadu / Juri Razgulaev	Uzbekistan	22.4	12	12	11	11
12	Elizabeth Punsalan / Jerod Swallow	United States	24.4	13	13	12	12
13	Irina Lobacheva / Ilia Averbukh	Russia	26.4	14	14	13	13
14	Elizaveta Stekolnikova / Dmitri Kazarlyga	Kazakhstan	28.4	15	15	14	14
15	Diane Gerencser / Alexander Stanislavov	Switzerland	31.0	18	17	15	15
16	Marika Humphreys / Justin Lanning	United Kingdom	32.0	16	16	16	16
17	Barbara Fusar-Poli / Alberto Reani	Italy	34.2	17	18	17	17
18	Elena Grushina / Ruslan Goncharov	Ukraine	36.6	20	19	18	18
19	Radmila Chroboková / Milan Brzý	Czech Republic	38.2	19	20	19	19
20	Angelika Führing / Peter Wilczek	Austria	40.4	21	21	20	20
21	Olga Pershankova / Nikolai Morozov	Azerbaijan	43.2	23	22	22	21
22	Laura Bonardi / Alessandro Reani	Italy	44.0	24	23	21	22
23	Sylwia Nowak / Sebastian Kolasiński	Poland	46.2	22	25	23	23
24	Nakako Tsuzuki / Kazo Nakamura	Japan	50.4	27	24	27	24
WD	Anjelika Krylova / Vladimir Fedorov	Russia		5	4	DNS	
Free dance not reached
26	Viera Poracova / Pavel Porac	Slovakia		28	26	25	
27	Albena Denkova / Hristo Nikolov	Bulgaria		25	27	26	
28	Galit Chait / Maxim Sevastianov	Israel		29	29	28	
29	Anastasia Grebenkina / Eriks Samovich	Latvia		30	30	29	
30	Anna Mosenkova / Dmitri Kurakin	Estonia		31	33	30	
31	Yuh-Shen Lai / Wei-Wen Lai	Chinese Taipei		32	31	31	
32	Park Yun-hee / Ryu Jong-hyun	South Korea		35	32	32	
33	Dinara Nurdbaeva / Muslim Settarov	Uzbekistan		34	36	23	
34	Christine Seydel / Duncan Smart	Australia		33	34	34	
35	Fiona Kirk / Clinton King	South Africa		36	35	35	
WD	Noemi Vedres / Endre Szentirmai	Hungary		26	28		
