= Largo al factotum =

Musical aria from Rossini's "The Barber of Seville"

"Largo al factotum"
Riccardo Stracciari, La Scala Orchestra, conducted by Lorenzo Molajoli, 1929

"Largo al factotum" (Make way for the factotum) is an aria (cavatina) from The Barber of Seville by Gioachino Rossini, sung at the first entrance of the title character, Figaro. The repeated "Figaro"s before the final patter section are an icon in popular culture of operatic singing. The term "factotum" refers to a general servant and comes from Latin where it literally means "do everything".

== Music ==
Because of the constant singing of eighth notes in 6/8 meter at an allegro vivace tempo, the piece is often noted as one of the most difficult baritone arias to perform. This, along with the tongue-twisting nature of some of the lines, insisting on Italian superlatives (always ending in "-issimo"), have made it a pièce de résistance in which a skilled baritone has the chance to highlight all of his qualities.

The aria is written in C major. The voice range covers D_{3} to G_{4} (optional A_{4}), with a very high tessitura. For this reason, few dramatic tenors have also sung the aria, notably Mario Del Monaco and Plácido Domingo.

== Libretto ==
The libretto to the opera was written by Cesare Sterbini.

Original lyrics
Largo al factotum della città.
Presto a bottega che l'alba è già.
Ah, che bel vivere, che bel piacere
per un barbiere di qualità!

Ah, bravo Figaro! Bravo, bravissimo!
Fortunatissimo per verità!

Pronto a far tutto, la notte e il giorno
sempre d'intorno in giro sta.
Miglior cuccagna per un barbiere,
vita più nobile, no, non si da.

Rasori e pettini, lancette e forbici,
al mio comando tutto qui sta.
V'è la risorsa, poi, del mestiere
colla donnetta ... col cavaliere ...

Tutti mi chiedono, tutti mi vogliono,
donne, ragazzi, vecchi, fanciulle:
Qua la parrucca ... Presto la barba ...
Qua la sanguigna ... Presto il biglietto ...
Figaro! Figaro! Figaro!, ecc.

Ahimè, che furia! Ahimè, che folla!
Uno alla volta, per carità!
Ehi, Figaro! Son qua.
Figaro qua, Figaro là,
Figaro su, Figaro giù.

Pronto prontissimo son come il fulmine:
sono il factotum della città.
Ah, bravo Figaro! Bravo, bravissimo;
a te fortuna non mancherà.
Sono il factotum della città!

Literal translation
Make way for the city's servant.
Off to the shop soon. It is already dawn.
Ah, what a beautiful life, what lovely pleasure
For a barber of quality!

Ah, worthy Figaro! Worthy, superb!
Most fortunate for sure!

Ready to do anything, night and day,
Always around and about.
A better Cockaigne for a barber,
A nobler life, there is none.

Razors and combs, lancets and scissors
Are all here at my command.
There is also resourcefulness, in the trade,
With the young lady, with the young man.

Everyone asks for me. Everyone wants me:
Women, boys, the elderly, girls.
Here this wig; quickly this beard;
Here this bleeding, quickly this note;
"Figaro! Figaro! Figaro!" etc.

Alas, what a fury! Alas, what a crowd!
One at a time, for charity's sake!
"Hey, Figaro!" Here I am!
Figaro here, Figaro there,
Figaro up, Figaro down.

Swift, swifter, like lightning I am.
I am the city's servant.
Ah, worthy Figaro! Worthy, superb;
Fortune will not fail you.
I am the city's servant!

Singable translation
I'm the factotum of all the town, make way!
Quick now to business, morning hath shown, 'tis day.
Oh, 'tis a charming life, brimful of pleasure,
that of a barber, used to high life.

No-one can vie with the brilliant Figaro, no, none.
Always in luck where good fortune is rife. Well done!

Early and late, for all who require me,
Nothing can tire me.
Of all the professions that can be mentioned,
That of a barber is best of all.

Scissors in hand, 'mongst my combs and my razors,
I stand at the door, when customers call.
Then there are cases, quite diplomatic,
Here damsel sighing, there swain ecstatic.

I am in such request, nor night nor day I've rest,
old men and maidens, matrons and gallants.
"Have you my wig there?" "Quick here and shave me."
"I've got a headache." "Run with this letter."
Figaro, Figaro, Figaro, etc.

No more this clamor! I'll bear no longer!
For pity's sake, speak one at a time!
Eh Figaro! I'm here.
Figaro here, Figaro there,
Figaro high, Figaro low.

I'm indispensable, irreprehensible,
I'm the factotum of all the town.
Ah bravo, Figaro, bravo, bravissimo,
thou art a favorite of Fortune.
I'm the factotum of all the town.

== Legacy ==
Beyond its frequent operatic and orchestral performances, the aria has appeared in various guises in popular culture, such as in cartoons. These include The Barber of Seville (a 1944 film with Woody Woodpecker acting as a mischievous barber), the final segment from the 1946 Disney film Make Mine Music, in Tex Avery's Magical Maestro (1952), and several Chuck Jones cartoons including Long-Haired Hare (1949), Rabbit of Seville (1950), One Froggy Evening (1955), and The Cat Above and the Mouse Below (1964), as well as many others. Examples of the song in film include A Farewell to Arms (1932), For the Love of Mary (1948, by actress/soprano Deanna Durbin), Hopscotch (1980), Oscar (1991), Mrs. Doubtfire (1993), Ice Age: Collision Course (2016), and Luca (2021).

Pop singer-songwriter Mika asserted that he used the main melody from "Largo al factotum" for his 2007 hit single "Grace Kelly". The aria was the entrance music for Italy during the opening ceremony of the 2026 Winter Olympics in Milan and Cortina d'Ampezzo.
