= Marina Eltsova =

Russian pair skater

Personal information
- Full name: Marina Alexeevna Eltsova
- Born: 4 February 1970 (age 56) Leningrad, Russian SFSR, Soviet Union
- Height: 5 ft 2 in (157 cm)

Figure skating career
- Country: Russia
- Retired: 1999
Medal record
Representing Russia
Pairs' Figure skating
World Championships
Gold medal – first place	1996 Edmonton	Pairs
Silver medal – second place	1997 Lausanne	Pairs
Bronze medal – third place	1994 Chiba	Pairs
European Championships
Gold medal – first place	1993 Helsinki	Pairs
Gold medal – first place	1997 Paris	Pairs
Grand Prix Final
Silver medal – second place	1995–1996 Paris	Pairs
Bronze medal – third place	1996–1997 Hamilton	Pairs
Russian Championships
Gold medal – first place	1993 Chelyabinsk	Pairs
Gold medal – first place	1995 Moscow	Pairs
Gold medal – first place	1997 Moscow	Pairs
Gold medal – first place	1998 Moscow	Pairs
Silver medal – second place	1996 Samara	Pairs
Representing Soviet Union
Winter Universiade
Gold medal – first place	1991 Sapporo	Pairs
Bronze medal – third place	1989 Sofia	Pairs
Soviet Championships
Bronze medal – third place	1992 Kyiv	Pairs

Marina Alexeevna Eltsova (Russian: Марина Алексеевна Ельцова; born 4 February 1970) is a Russian former pair skater. She represented the Soviet Union until its fall, and, after that, Russia. With partner Andrei Bushkov, she is the 1996 World champion and a two-time (1993 and 1997) European champion.

Eltsova and Bushkov missed the 1997–1998 Champions Series Final because Bushkov had a groin injury. They withdrew from the 1998 European Championships – Bushkov's right blade broke during the short program. The pair competed at the 1998 Winter Olympics, where they placed seventh. They were coached by Natalia Pavlova in Saint Petersburg.

Eltsova previously skated with Sergei Zaitsev, representing the Soviet Union.

== Competitive highlights ==
GP: Champions Series / Grand Prix

=== With Bushkov ===
International
Event	90–91	91–92	92–93	93–94	94–95	95–96	96–97	97–98	98–99
Olympics								7th	
Worlds			6th	3rd	4th	1st	2nd	6th	
Europeans			1st		4th	4th	1st	WD	
GP Final						2nd	3rd		
GP Cup of Russia							2nd	1st	5th
GP Lalique									3rd
GP Nations Cup						1st	2nd		
GP Skate America						1st		1st	
GP Skate Canada							2nd		
Centennial On Ice						2nd			
Goodwill Games					2nd				
Inter. de Paris/ Trophée de France				2nd	1st				
NHK Trophy	4th	3rd	2nd		1st				
Skate America	1st		1st		1st				
Skate Canada		3rd							
Universiade	1st								
National
Russian Champ.			1st	4th	1st	2nd	1st	1st	4th
Soviet Champ.	4th	3rd							
WD = Withdrew

=== With Zaitsev ===
International
Event	1986–87	1987–88	1988–89
Skate America			2nd
Prize of Moscow News	8th		3rd
Winter Universiade			3rd
National
USSR Cup	3rd	3rd	
