= Czechoslovak Figure Skating Championships =

Defunct figure skating competition

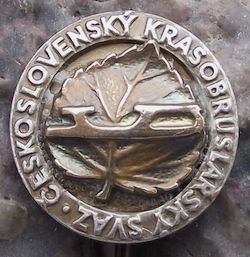
- Status: Defunct
- Genre: National championships
- Frequency: Annual
- Country: Czechoslovakia
- Years active: 1924–1993
- Organizer: Czechoslovak Figure Skating Union

The Czechoslovak Figure Skating Championships (Czech: Mistrovství Československa v krasobruslení; Slovak: Majstrovstvá Československa v krasokorčuľovaní) were an annual figure skating competition organized by the Czechoslovak Figure Skating Union (Czech: Československý krasobruslařský svaz; Slovak: Československý krasokorčuliarsky zväz) to crown the national champions of Czechoslovakia. The championships held in Prague in 1924 were the first after a break of several years, and featured competitions in both speed skating and figure skating. No competitions were held between 1940 and 1945 due to the German occupation of Czechoslovakia during World War II. The final installment took place in December 1992, just weeks before the dissolution of Czechoslovakia. The establishment of independent Czech and Slovak Republics led to separate Czech and Slovak Figure Skating Championships.

Medals were awarded in men's singles, women's singles, pair skating, and ice dance. Karol Divín holds the record for winning the most Czechoslovak Championship titles in men's singles (with eleven), while Hana Mašková holds the record in women's singles (with five), Soňa Balunová and Miloslav Balun hold the record in pair skating (with six), and Eva Romanová and Pavel Roman hold the record in ice dance (with seven).

== History ==
The First Czechoslovak Republic was established in 1918 after the dissolution of the Austro-Hungarian Empire. The Skating Union of the Czechoslovak Republic (Czech: Bruslařský svaz Československé republiky; Slovak: Korčuliarsky zväz Československej republiky) was formed in 1922, bringing together Czechs and Slovaks in both figure skating and speed skating. Meanwhile, the first skating championships after a break of several years were held in Prague in 1924, and featured competitions in both speed skating and figure skating. Prior to the construction of indoor ice rinks, figure skating in Czechoslovakia was dependent on the weather, as lakes and outdoor rinks needed to be sufficiently frozen for skaters to practice, let alone compete. The first indoor ice rink in Czechoslovakia was built on Štvanice in Prague in 1932, establishing Prague as the skating center of Czechoslovakia. Skating lagged in Slovakia until the construction of an artificial ice rink in Bratislava. The Czechoslovak Figure Skating Union was established in 1945, separate from other skating disciplines, to foster cooperation between Czech and Slovak figure skaters.

The peaceful dissolution of Czechoslovakia occurred on 31 December 1992, leading to the creation of two independent nations: the Czech Republic and Slovakia. The Czechoslovak Figure Skating Championships had already been held in Hradec Králové earlier in December. Therefore, the first figure skating championships of the newly independent Czech Republic and Slovakia did not take place until 1994. Many Czechoslovak medalists went on to compete successfully for the newly independent nations: Kateřina Beránková, Radka Kovaříková, Lenka Kulovaná, René Novotný, Jaroslav Suchý, and Irena Zemanová for the Czech Republic; and Pavol Poráč, Viera Poráčová, Zaneta Štefániková, and Rastislav Vnučko for Slovakia.

== Senior medalists ==
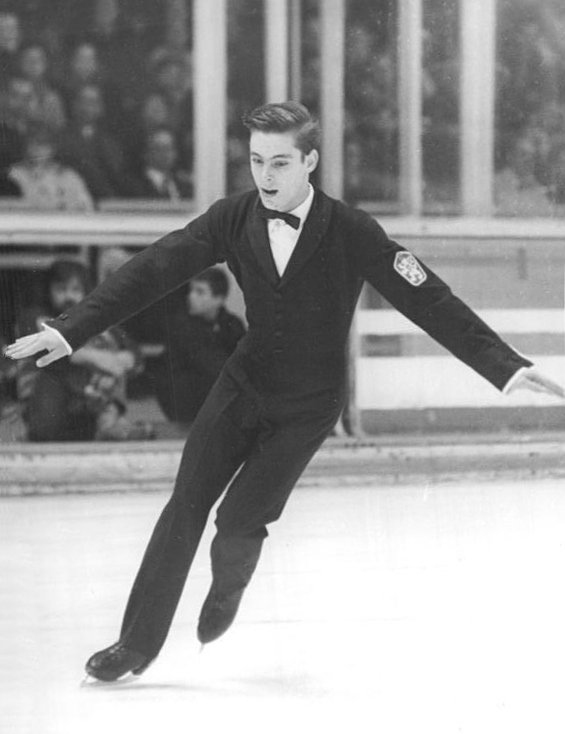
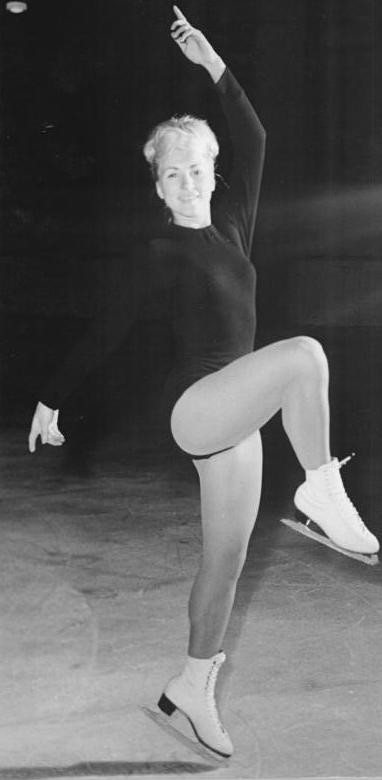
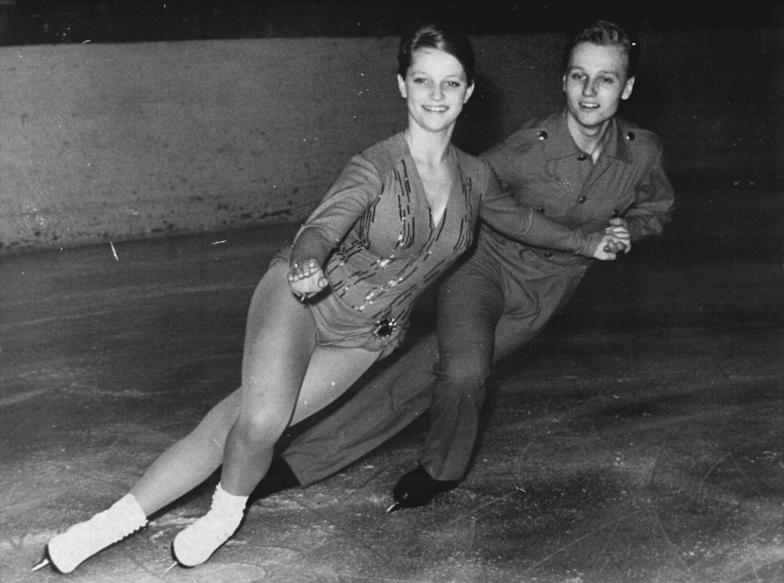
From left to right: Ondrej Nepela, eight-time Czechoslovak champion in men's singles; Jana Mrázková, five-time Czechoslovak champion in women's singles; and Eva Romanová and Pavel Roman, seven-time Czechoslovak champions in ice dance

=== Men's singles ===
Ondrej Nepela, eight-time Czechoslovak national champion, died in 1989 at the age of 38. The Ondrej Nepela Memorial premiered in 1993, and is held annually at the Ondrej Nepela Arena in Bratislava, Slovakia. Nepela was named the Slovak Athlete of the Century in 2000.

Senior men's event medalists
Year	Location	Gold	Silver	Bronze	Ref.
1924	Prague	Josef Slíva	Antonín Slíva	Dr. Slánský	
1925	Banská Bystrica	Josef Slíva	Antonín Slíva	Otto Maršálek	
1926	Prague	Josef Slíva	Otto Maršálek	František Mann	
1927	Prague	Josef Slíva	Antonín Slíva	Otto Maršálek	
1928	Prague	Josef Slíva	Antonín Slíva	Otto Gold	
1929	Prague	Josef Slíva	Antonín Slíva	Bohumil Sak	
1930	Štrbské Pleso	Josef Slíva	Antonín Slíva	(Socialist Federal Republic of Yugoslavia) France Avčin (Yugoslavia)	
1931	Prague	Josef Slíva	Rudolf Pražnovský	Antonín Slíva	
1932	Ostrava	Josef Slíva	Vladimír Koudelka	Bohumil Sak	
1933	Prague	Vladimír Koudelka	Josef Bernhauser (Austria)	Herbert Haertel (Germany)	
1934	Plzeň	Vladimír Koudelka	Rudolf Pražnovský	Helmut Losert	
1935	Banská Bystrica	Rudolf Pražnovský	Vladimír Koudelka	Jaroslav Sadílek	
1936	Opava	Emil Ratzenhofer (Austria) (Note: Jaroslav Sadilek was named the 1936 Czechoslovak champion, because Emil Ratzenhofer, the first-place finisher, was a guest skater from Austria.)	Jaroslav Sadílek	Helmut Losert	
1937	Hradec Králové	Rudolf Pražnovský	Jaroslav Sadílek	Miroslav Hasenöhrl	
1938	Hradec Králové	Miroslav Hasenöhrl	No other competitors listed		
1939	Prague	Jaroslav Sadílek	No other competitors listed		
1940–45	No competitions due to World War II				
1946	Prague	Zdeněk Fikar	Josef Dědič	Vladislav Čáp	
1947	Prague	Josef Dědič	Zdeněk Fikar	Vladislav Čáp	
1948	Pardubice	Vladislav Čáp	Zdeněk Fikar	Josef Dědič	
1949	Prague	Vladislav Čáp	Zdeněk Fikar	Ivan Mauer	
1950	Ostrava	Zdeněk Fikar	Vladislav Čáp	Karol Divín	
1951	Prague	Zdeněk Fikar	Karol Divín	Vladislav Čáp	
1952	Ostrava	Zdeněk Fikar	Miroslav Kutina	Vladislav Čáp	
1953	Bratislava	Zdeněk Fikar	Vladislav Čáp	Ivan Mauer	
1954	Brno	Karol Divín	Zdeněk Fikar	Ivan Mauer	
1955	Ostrava	Karol Divín	Ivan Mauer	Miroslav Kutina	
1956	Prague	Karol Divín	Ivan Mauer	Gerhardt Bubník	
1957	Prague	Karol Divín	Gerhardt Bubník	Pavel Fohler	
1958	Prague	Karol Divín	Pavel Fohler	Jaromír Holan	
1959	Bratislava	Karol Divín	Pavel Fohler	Jaromír Holan	
1960	Prague	Karol Divín	Pavel Fohler	Jaromír Holan	
1961	Ostrava	Karol Divín	Bodo Bockenauer (East Germany)	Jaromír Holan	
1962	Bratislava	Karol Divín	Václav Kotek	Karel Fajfr	
1963	Opava	Karol Divín	Václav Kotek	Marián Filc	
1964	Brno	Karol Divín	Ondrej Nepela	Václav Kotek	
1965	Prague	Ondrej Nepela	Marián Filc	Václav Kotek	
1966	Ostrava	Ondrej Nepela	Marián Filc	Josef Tůma	
1967	Gottwaldov	Ondrej Nepela	Marián Filc	Josef Tůma	
1968	Brno	Ondrej Nepela	Marián Filc	Petr Starec	
1969	České Budějovice	Ondrej Nepela	Marián Filc	Petr Starec	
1970	Prešov	Jozef Žídek	Zdeněk Pazdírek	František Pechar	
1971	Plzeň	Ondrej Nepela	Zdeněk Pazdírek	Jozef Žídek	
1972	Karviná	Ondrej Nepela	Zdeněk Pazdírek	Jozef Žídek	
1973	Liptovský Mikuláš	Ondrej Nepela	Zdeněk Pazdírek	František Pechar	
1974	Prague	Zdeněk Pazdírek	František Pechar	Miroslav Šoška	
1975	Havířov	Zdeněk Pazdírek	František Pechar	Miroslav Šoška	
1976	Prague	Miroslav Šoška	Zdeněk Pazdírek	Karel Zelenka	
1977	Žilina	Miroslav Šoška	František Pechar	Jozef Sabovčík	
1978	Brno	Miroslav Šoška	Ivan Králik	Mr. Jelínek	
1979	Bratislava	Miroslav Šoška	Jozef Sabovčík	Josef Šenk	
1980	Karviná	Jozef Sabovčík	Miroslav Šoška	Josef Šenk	
1981	Košice	Jozef Sabovčík	Ivan Králik	Josef Šenk	
1982	Prostějov	Jozef Sabovčík	Ivan Králik	Josef Šenk	
1983	Banská Bystrica	Jozef Sabovčík	Petr Barna	Villiam Kálavský	
1984	Olomouc	Jozef Sabovčík	Petr Barna	Villiam Kálavský	
1985	Havířov	Petr Barna	Jozef Sabovčík	Josef Šenk	
1986	Bratislava	Jozef Sabovčík	Jaroslav Suchý	Miroslav Picek	
1987	Prostějov	Petr Barna	Jaroslav Suchý	Miroslav Picek	
1988	Nitra	Petr Barna	Jaroslav Suchý	Martin Kotulič	
1989	Havířov	Petr Barna	Pavel Vančo	Jiří Jahn	
1990	Ostrava	Petr Barna	Pavel Vančo	Jiří Jahn	
1991	Prague	Petr Barna	Rastislav Vnučko	Karol Ištoňa	
1992	Ružomberok	Petr Barna	Jaroslav Suchý	Rastislav Vnučko	
1993	Hradec Králové	Rastislav Vnučko	Jaroslav Suchý	Ladislav Vince	

=== Women's singles ===
Senior women's event medalists
Year	Location	Gold	Silver	Bronze	Ref.
1924	Prague	Ms. Višková	Libuše Veselá	No other competitors	
1925	Banská Bystrica	Libuše Veselá	No other competitors		
1926	Prague	Libuše Veselá	No other competitors		
1927	Prague	Libuše Veselá	No other competitors		
1928	Prague	Libuše Veselá	No other competitors		
1929	Prague	Edel Randem (Norway)	No other competitors		
1930	Štrbské Pleso	No women's competitors			
1931	Prague	Libuše Veselá	H. Fröhlichová	No other competitors	
1932	Ostrava	Paula Schmidt (Germany)	Libuše Veselá	Fräulein Ritscher (Germany)	
1933	Prague	Liselotte Landbeck (Austria) (Note: Although Libuše Veselá finished in seventh place, she was named the 1933 Czechoslovak champion, because she was the highest-ranked Czechoslovak skater.)	Yvonne de Ligne (Belgium)	Maxi Herber (Germany)	
1934	Plzeň	Fritzi Metznerová	J. Mikšová	Libuše Veselá	
1935	Banská Bystrica	Fritzi Metznerová	Liesl Helbaum	Ms. Subrt	
1936	Opava	Fräulein Reisinger (Austria) (Note: Věra Hrubá was named the 1936 Czechoslovak champion, because Fräulein Reisinger, the first-place finisher, was a guest skater from Austria.)	Věra Hrubá	Fritzi Metznerová	
1937	Hradec Králové	Věra Hrubá	Anna Houdková	Zdeňka Porgesová	
1938	Hradec Králové	Eva Nyklová	Eva Katzová	Zdeňka Porgesová	
1939	Prague	Eva Nyklová	No other competitors listed		
1940–45	No competitions due to World War II				
1946	Prague	Eva Nyklová	Jiřina Nekolová	Alena Vrzáňová	
1947	Prague	Alena Vrzáňová	Jiřina Nekolová	Dagmar Lerchová	
1948	Pardubice	Alena Vrzáňová	Dagmar Lerchová	Ms. Masaková	
1949	Prague	Alena Vrzáňová	Jiřina Nekolová	Dagmar Lerchová	
1950	Ostrava	Alena Vrzáňová	Dagmar Lerchová	No other competitors	
1951	Prague	Dagmar Lerchová	Alexandra Černá	Miroslava Náchodská	
1952	Ostrava	Dagmar Lerchová	Miroslava Náchodská	Jarmila Königová	
1953	Bratislava	Milena Tůmová	Miroslava Náchodská	Jarmila Königová	
1954	Brno	Milena Tůmová	Dagmar Lerchová	Alexandra Černá	
1955	Ostrava	Dagmar Lerchová-Řeháková	Milena Tůmová	Miroslava Náchodská	
1956	Prague	Milena Tůmová	Jindra Kramperová	Milena Kladrubská	
1957	Prague	Jindra Kramperová	Jitka Hlaváčková	Jana Dočekalová	
1958	Prague	Jindra Kramperová	Jana Dočekalová	Jitka Hlaváčková	
1959	Bratislava	Jindra Kramperová	Jana Dočekalová	Jitka Hlaváčková	
1960	Prague	Jana Mrázková	Jitka Hlaváčková	Jindra Kramperová	
1961	Ostrava	Jana Mrázková	Jindra Kramperová	Eva Grožajová	
1962	Bratislava	Jana Mrázková	Eva Grožajová	Jitka Hlaváčková	
1963	Opava	Jana Mrázková	Eva Grožajová	Jitka Šimonová	
1964	Brno	Jana Mrázková	Alena Augustová	Bohunka Šrámková	
1965	Prague	Hana Mašková	Jana Mrázková	Bohunka Šrámková	
1966	Ostrava	Hana Mašková	Alena Augustová	Marie Víchová	
1967	Gottwaldov	Hana Mašková	Marie Víchová	Eva Gašparcová	
1968	Brno	Hana Mašková	Marie Víchová	Eva Gašparcová	
1969	České Budějovice	Hana Mašková	Eleonora Barická	Ľudmila Bezáková	
1970	Prešov	Ľudmila Bezáková	Liana Drahová	Iva Matysová	
1971	Plzeň	Ľudmila Bezáková	Liana Drahová	Iva Matysová	
1972	Karviná	Liana Drahová	Ľudmila Bezáková	Helena Sedláčková	
1973	Liptovský Mikuláš	Liana Drahová	Hana Knapová	V. Nádvorníková	
1974	Prague	Liana Drahová	Zdenka Fiurášková	Eva Štolfová	
1975	Havířov	Liana Drahová	Hana Knapová	Iva Cibulková	
1976	Prague	Hana Knapová	Eva Ďurišinová	Renata Baierová	
1977	Žilina	Eva Ďurišinová	Renata Baierová	Hana Schiesslová	
1978	Brno	Renata Baierová	Eva Ďurišinová	Hana Veselá	
1979	Bratislava	Renata Baierová	Hana Veselá	Eva Ďurišinová	
1980	Karviná	Renata Baierová	Barbora Knotková	Hana Veselá	
1981	Košice	Renata Baierová	Hana Veselá	Barbora Knotková	
1982	Prostějov	Hana Veselá	Barbora Knotková	Tatiana Michalková	
1983	Banská Bystrica	Hana Veselá	Gabriela Ballová	Tatiana Michalková	
1984	Olomouc	Hana Veselá	Gabriela Ballová	Kateřina Kamberská	
1985	Havířov	Gabriela Ballová	Hana Veselá	Jana Přibylová	
1986	Bratislava	Gabriela Ballová	Jana Přibylová	Jana Petrušková	
1987	Prostějov	Iveta Voralová	Kateřina Nováková	Jana Petrušková	
1988	Nitra	Iveta Voralová	Kateřina Nováková	Jana Petrušková	
1989	Havířov	Iveta Voralová	Marcela Kochollová	Kateřina Mrázová	
1990	Ostrava	Lenka Kulovaná	Marcela Kochollová	Kateřina Mrázová	
1991	Prague	Lenka Kulovaná	Zaneta Štefániková	Gabriela Guzejová	
1992	Ružomberok	Lenka Kulovaná	Irena Zemanová	Kateřina Beránková	
1993	Hradec Králové	Lenka Kulovaná	Kateřina Beránková	Zaneta Štefániková	

=== Pairs ===
Senior pairs event medalists
Year	Location	Gold	Silver	Bronze	Ref.
1924	Prague	Libuše Veselá; Vojtěch Veselý	Ms. Holzbachová; Mr. Kundert	No other competitors	
1925	Banská Bystrica	Libuše Veselá; Vojtěch Veselý	No other competitors		
1926	Prague	Libuše Veselá; Vojtěch Veselý	Ms. Gorková; Mr. Kundert	No other competitors	
1927	Prague	Pairs competition cancelled due to poor condition of the ice			
1928	Prague	Libuše Veselá; Vojtěch Veselý	No other competitors		
1929	Prague	Else Hoppe; Oscar Hoppe	Slečna Waldová; Otto Gold	No other competitors	
1930	Štrbské Pleso	Libuše Veselá; Vojtěch Veselý	H. Fröhlichová; Mr. Tabeles	No other competitors	
1931	Prague	Else Hoppe; Oscar Hoppe	Libuše Veselá; Vojtěch Veselý	No other competitors	
1932	Ostrava	Libuše Veselá; Vojtěch Veselý	Ms. Holzbach; Josef Vosolsobě	Ms. Martinková; Mr. Pavlik	
1933	Prague	(Poland); Zofia Bilorówna; Tadeusz Kowalski; (Poland) (Note: Libuše Veselá and Vojtěch Veselý were named the 1933 Czechoslovak champions, because the first- and second-place teams were guest skaters from Poland and Austria, respectively.)	(Austria); Hansi Kast; Otto Kaiser; (Austria)	Libuše Veselá; Vojtěch Veselý	
1934	Plzeň	Pairs competition cancelled due to poor condition of the ice			
1935	Banská Bystrica	(Austria); Liese Klanek; Adolf Rozdol; (Austria) (Note: Věra Trejbalová and Josef Vosolsobě were named the 1935 Czechoslovak champions, because Liese Kianek and Adolf Rozdol, the first-place finishers, were guest skaters from Austria.) (Note: There were no pairs champions named in 1936, because all of the competitors were guest skaters from Austria.)	Věra Trejbalová; Josef Vosolsobě	Běla Zachová; Karel Glogar	
1936	Opava	(Austria); Liese Klanek; Adolf Rozdol; (Austria)	(Austria); Edeltraut Kafka; Kurt Hanke; (Austria)	No other competitors	
1937	Hradec Králové	Věra Trejbalová; Josef Vosolsobě	Ms. Procházková; Mr. Suk	Feda Kalenčíková; Karel Glogar	
1938	Hradec Králové	Věra Trejbalová; Josef Vosolsobě	A. Wächterlová; Fritz Lesk	Ms. Procházková; Mr. Suk	
1939	Prague	Ms. Delavosová; Mr. Wachtl	No other competitors listed		
1940–45	No competitions due to World War II				
1946	Prague	Eva Doušková; Jaroslav Sadílek	Běla Zachová; Jaroslav Zach	Ľudmila Dulková; Jozef Šturm	
1947	Prague	Běla Zachová; Jaroslav Zach	Eva Doušková; Jaroslav Sadílek	Blažena Knittlová; Karel Vosátka	
1948	Pardubice	Blažena Knittlová; Karel Vosátka	Dagmar Hrubá; Jiří Očenášek	Ms. Prenosilová; František Landi	
1949	Prague	Běla Zachová; Jaroslav Zach	Soňa Balunová; Miloslav Balun	No other competitors	
1950	Ostrava	Soňa Balunová; Miloslav Balun	Blažena Knittlová; Karel Vosátka	Ľudmila Dulková; Emil Skákala	
1951	Prague	Soňa Balunová; Miloslav Balun	Věra Suchánková; Zdeněk Doležal	No other competitors	
1952	Ostrava	Soňa Balunová; Miloslav Balun	Blažena Knittlová; Karel Vosátka	Věra Suchánková; Zdeněk Doležal	
1953	Bratislava	Soňa Balunová; Miloslav Balun	Blažena Knittlová; Karel Vosátka	No other competitors	
1954	Brno	Soňa Balunová; Miloslav Balun	Věra Vajsábelová; Karel Vosátka	Věra Suchánková; Zdeněk Doležal	
1955	Ostrava	Soňa Balunová; Miloslav Balun	Věra Suchánková; Zdeněk Doležal	Věra Vajsábelová; Karel Vosátka	
1956	Prague	Věra Suchánková; Zdeněk Doležal	Hana Dvořáková; Karel Vosátka	Ms. Bečková; Mr. Hodaň	
1957	Prague	Věra Suchánková; Zdeněk Doležal	Hana Dvořáková; Karel Vosátka	Ms. Červenková; Mr. Lebr	
1958	Prague	Věra Suchánková; Zdeněk Doležal	Hana Dvořáková; Karel Vosátka	Eva Romanová; Pavel Roman	
1959	Bratislava	Hana Dvořáková; Karel Vosátka	Eva Romanová; Pavel Roman	Milada Kubíková; Jaroslav Votruba	
1960	Prague	Hana Dvořáková; Karel Vosátka	Marie Hezinová; Karel Janouch	Milada Kubíková; Jaroslav Votruba	
1961	Ostrava	Hana Dvořáková; Karel Vosátka	Milada Kubíková; Jaroslav Votruba	(East Germany); Margit Senf; Peter Göbel; (East Germany)	
1962	Bratislava	Milada Kubíková; Jaroslav Votruba	Agnesa Wlachovská; Peter Bartosiewicz	Irena Špatenková; Milan Cirman	
1963	Opava	Milada Kubíková; Jaroslav Votruba	Agnesa Wlachovská; Peter Bartosiewicz	Olga Reinišová; Pavel Komárek	
1964	Brno	Agnesa Wlachovská; Peter Bartosiewicz	Věra Stehlíková; Karel Fajfr	Olga Reinišová; Pavel Komárek	
1965	Prague	Agnesa Wlachovská; Peter Bartosiewicz	Věra Stehlíková; Karel Fajfr	Miroslava Sáblíková; Pavel Komárek	
1966	Ostrava	Agnesa Wlachovská; Peter Bartosiewicz	Bohunka Šrámková; Jan Šrámek	Miroslava Sáblíková; Pavel Komárek	
1967	Gottwaldov	Bohunka Šrámková; Jan Šrámek	Dana Fialová; Milos Man	Marika Nagyová; Karel Fajfr	
1968	Brno	Liana Drahová; Peter Bartosiewicz	Bohunka Šrámková; Jan Šrámek	Marika Nagyová; Karel Fajfr	
1969	České Budějovice	Liana Drahová; Peter Bartosiewicz	Dana Fialová; Josef Tůma	Miroslava Sáblíková; Pavel Komárek	
1970	Prešov	Dana Fialová; Josef Tůma	Irena Hankusová; Stanislav Židek	Lea Kostelková; J. Smažil	
1971	Plzeň	Dana Fialová; Josef Tůma	Miroslava Sáblíková; Pavel Komárek	Ms. Nagyová; Mr. Lounek	
1972	Karviná	Miroslava Sáblíková; Pavel Komárek	Irena Hankusová; Stanislav Židek	Ilona Urbanová; Mr. Horniak	
1973	Liptovský Mikuláš	Ilona Urbanová; Ales Zach	Rijana Hartmanová; Petr Starec	Galina Drahová; Stanislav Židek	
1974	Prague	Rijana Hartmanová; Petr Starec	Ilona Urbanová; Ales Zach	Ingrid Spieglová; Alan Spiegl	
1975	Havířov	Ingrid Spieglová; Alan Spiegl; (Note: Ingrid Spieglová and Alan Spiegl were not awarded the title of Czechoslovak champions, because the minimum required number of entrants in the competition was not met.)	Jana Blahová; Ludek Feňo	No other competitors	
1976	Prague	Ingrid Spieglová; Alan Spiegl	Jana Blahová; Ludek Feňo	Ramona Thýnová; Vlastimil Burian	
1977	Žilina	Ingrid Spieglová; Alan Spiegl	Jana Blahová; Ludek Feňo	Renata Kostková; Jozef Komár	
1978	Brno	Ingrid Spieglová; Alan Spiegl	Ramona Thýnová; Vlastimil Burian	No other competitors	
1979	Bratislava	Ingrid Spieglová; Alan Spiegl	Renata Kostková; Jozef Komár	Ramona Thýnová; Vlastimil Burian	
1980	Karviná	Ingrid Spieglová; Alan Spiegl	Renata Kostková; Jozef Komár	Ingrid Ženatá; René Novotný	
1981–82	No pairs competitors				
1983	Banská Bystrica	Jana Havlová; René Novotný	Dagmar Kovářová; Jozef Komár	Hana Dědková; Ladislav Kozák	
1984	Olomouc	Dagmar Kovářová; Jozef Komár	No other competitors		
1985	Havířov	Lenka Knapová; René Novotný	Dagmar Kovářová; Jozef Komár	No other competitors	
1986	Bratislava	Lenka Knapová; René Novotný; (Note: Lenka Knapová and René Novotný were not awarded the title of Czechoslovak champions, because the minimum required number of entrants in the competition was not met.)	No other competitors		
1987	Prostějov	Lenka Knapová; René Novotný	Dagmar Kovářová; Karel Kovář	Ms. Mentlíková; Mr. Duras	
1988	Nitra	Lenka Knapová; René Novotný	Dagmar Kovářová; Karel Kovář	Barbora Smolíková; Roman Oberfranc	
1989	Havířov	Radka Kovaříková; René Novotný; (Note: Radka Kovaříková and René Novotný were not awarded the title of Czechoslovak champions, because the minimum required number of entrants in the competition was not met.)	Barbora Smolíková; Roman Oberfranc	No other competitors	
1990	Ostrava	Radka Kovaříková; René Novotný	Svetlana Dragaeva; Karel Kovář	No other competitors	
1991	Prague	Radka Kovaříková; René Novotný	No other competitors		
1992–93	No pairs competitors				

=== Ice dance ===
Pavel Roman, seven-time Czechoslovak champion in ice dance with his sister Eva Romanová, died in a motorcycle crash in 1972. In 1992, the Olomouc Figure Skating Club debuted the Pavel Roman Memorial – a competition exclusively for ice dance – in Olomouc, in what was then Czechoslovakia. Since the dissolution of Czechoslovakia, this competition has continued annually in the Czech Republic.

Senior ice dance event medalists
Year	Location	Gold	Silver	Bronze	Ref.
1959	Bratislava	Eva Romanová; Pavel Roman	Jitka Babická; Jaromír Holan	Eva Grožajová; Reinhold Šturm	
1960	Prague	Eva Romanová; Pavel Roman	Jitka Babická; Jaromír Holan	Ms. Zapletalová; Mr. Hodan	
1961	Ostrava	Eva Romanová; Pavel Roman	Jitka Babická; Jaromír Holan	Anna Horecká; Ivan Herman	
1962	Bratislava	Eva Romanová; Pavel Roman	Jitka Babická; Jaromír Holan	Anna Horecká; Ivan Herman	
1963	Opava	Eva Romanová; Pavel Roman	Jitka Babická; Jaromír Holan	Sylva Draisaitlová; Miroslav Gřešek	
1964	Brno	Eva Romanová; Pavel Roman	Jitka Babická; Jaromír Holan	Sylva Draisaitlová; Miroslav Gřešek	
1965	Prague	Eva Romanová; Pavel Roman	Jitka Babická; Jaromír Holan	Ludmila Kotková; Václav Kotek	
1966	Ostrava	Jitka Babická; Jaromír Holan	Sylva Draisaitlová; Miroslav Gřešek	Dana Novotná; Jaroslav Hainz	
1967	Gottwaldov	Jitka Babická; Jaromír Holan	Dana Novotná; Jaroslav Hainz	Milena Tůmová; Josef Pešek	
1968	Brno	Dana Novotná; Jaromír Holan	Milena Tůmová; Josef Pešek	Ms. Mihalisková; Jaroslav Hainz	
1969	České Budějovice	Dana Novotná; Jaromír Holan	Milena Tůmová; Josef Pešek	Diana Skotnická; Martin Skotnický	
1970	Prešov	Diana Skotnická; Martin Skotnický	Eva Sklenská; Jan Řesek	Svetlana Marinovová; Miloš Buršík	
1971	Plzeň	Diana Skotnická; Martin Skotnický	Svetlana Marinovová; Miloš Buršík	Dana Rousová; Dusan Rous	
1972	Karviná	Diana Skotnická; Martin Skotnický	Svetlana Marinovová; Miloš Buršík	Ludmilla Nogolová; František Blaťák	
1973	Liptovský Mikuláš	Diana Skotnická; Martin Skotnický	Ludmilla Nogolová; František Blaťák	Eva Peštová; Jiří Pokorný	
1974	Prague	Diana Skotnická; Martin Skotnický	Eva Peštová; Jiří Pokorný	Anna Pisánská; Jiří Musil	
1975	Havířov	Eva Peštová; Jiří Pokorný	Anna Pisánská; Jiří Musil	Liliana Řeháková; Stanislav Drastich	
1976	Prague	Eva Peštová; Jiří Pokorný	Zuzana Vránová; Kamil Budík	Eva Štolfová; Jan Barták	
1977	Žilina	Liliana Řeháková; Stanislav Drastich	Anna Pisánská; Jiří Musil	Zuzana Vránová; Kamil Budík	
1978	Brno	Liliana Řeháková; Stanislav Drastich	Jindra Holá; Jiří Pokorný	Jana Beránková; Karol Foltán	
1979	Bratislava	Liliana Řeháková; Stanislav Drastich	Anna Pisánská; Jiří Musil	Jindra Holá; Karol Foltán	
1980	Karviná	Liliana Řeháková; Stanislav Drastich	Anna Pisánská; Jiří Musil	Jindra Holá; Karol Foltán	
1981	Košice	Jana Beránková; Jan Barták	Jindra Holá; Karol Foltán	Viera Mináríková; Ivan Havránek	
1982	Prostějov	Jana Beránková; Jan Barták	Jindra Holá; Karol Foltán	Viera Mináríková; Ivan Havránek	
1983	Banská Bystrica	Jindra Holá; Karol Foltán	Viera Mináríková; Ivan Havránek	Jana Kašpárková; Pavel Laurenčík	
1984	Olomouc	Jindra Holá; Karol Foltán	Viera Mináríková; Ivan Havránek	Jana Kašpárková; Pavel Laurenčík	
1985	Havířov	Jindra Holá; Karol Foltán	Viera Mináríková; Ivan Havránek	Dana Jendrisková; Roman Sabol	
1986	Bratislava	Viera Řeháková; Ivan Havránek	Jana Kašpárková; Pavel Laurenčík	Jana Pospišilová; Michal Mrva	
1987	Prostějov	Viera Řeháková; Ivan Havránek	Andrea Juklová; Martin Šimeček	Jana Pospišilová; Michal Mrva	
1988	Nitra	Viera Řeháková; Ivan Havránek	Andrea Juklová; Martin Šimeček	Ivana Střondalová; Milan Brzý	
1989	Havířov	Andrea Juklová; Martin Šimeček; (Note: Andrea Juklová and Martin Šimeček were not awarded the title of Czechoslovak champions, because the minimum required number of entrants in the competition was not met.)	Monika Mandíková; Oliver Pekár	No other competitors	
1990	Ostrava	Ivana Střondalová; Milan Brzý	Monika Mandíková; Oliver Pekár	Ms. Goliášová; Mr. David	
1991	Prague	Kateřina Mrázová; Martin Šimeček; (Note: Kateřina Mrázová and Martin Šimeček were not awarded the title of Czechoslovak champions, because the minimum required number of entrants in the competition was not met.)	Monika Mandíková; Oliver Pekár	No other competitors	
1992	Ružomberok	Kateřina Mrázová; Martin Šimeček	Radmila Chroboková; Milan Brzý	Viera Poráčová; Pavol Poráč	
1993	Hradec Králové	Kateřina Mrázová; Martin Šimeček	Radmila Chroboková; Milan Brzý	Viera Poráčová; Pavol Poráč	

== Records ==
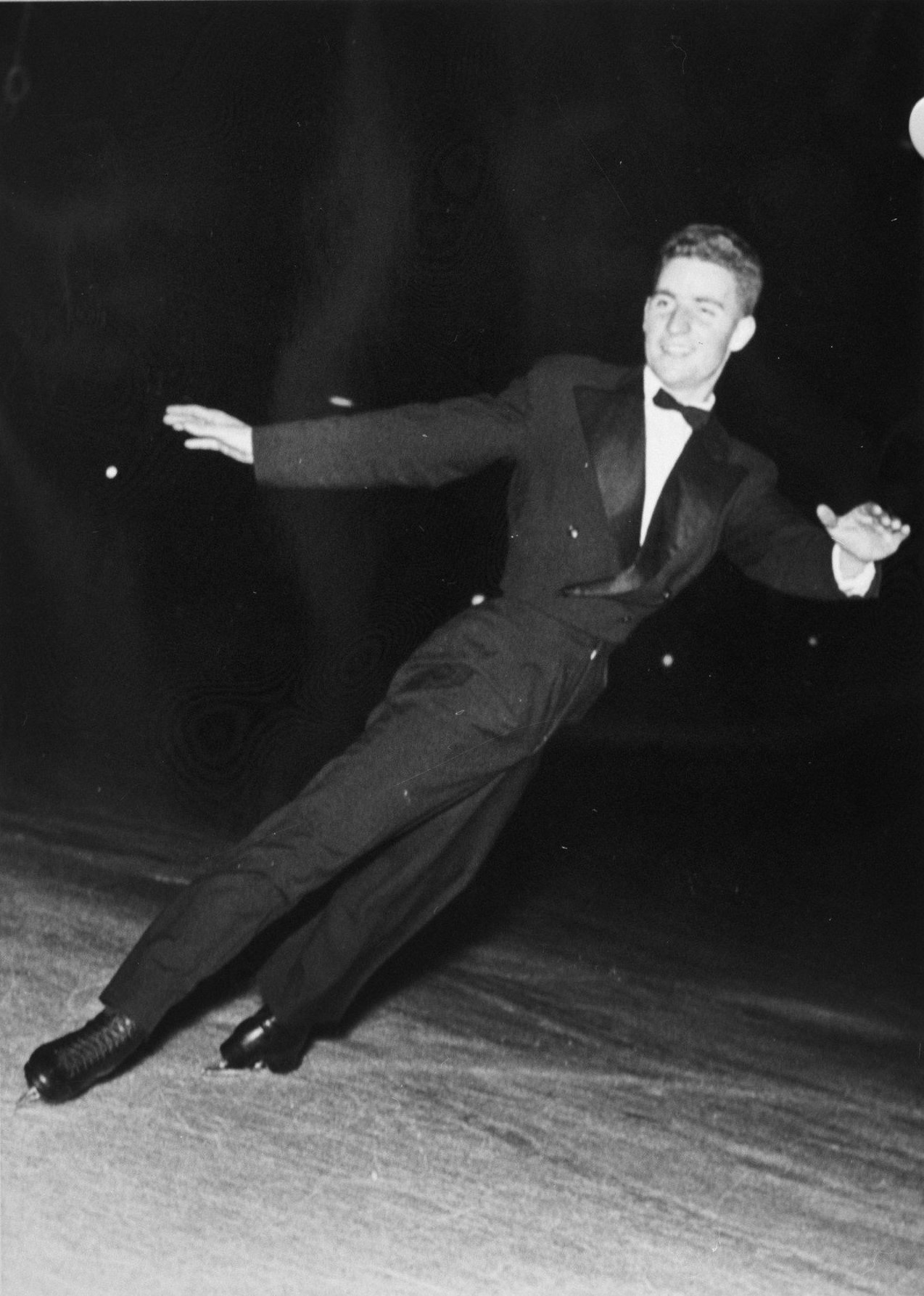
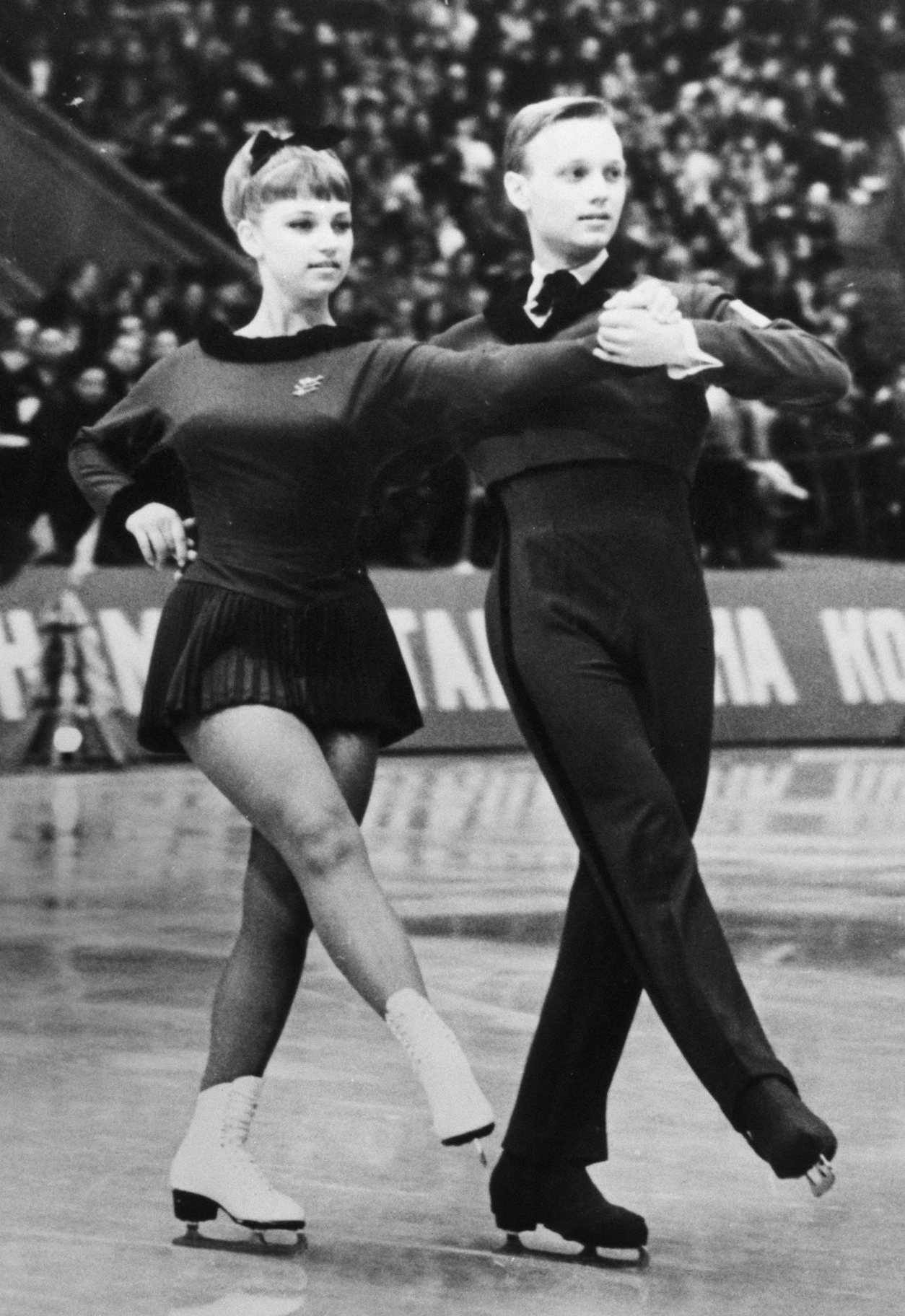
From left to right: Karol Divín won eleven Czechoslovak Championship titles in men's singles; while Eva Romanová and Pavel Roman won seven Czechoslovak Championship titles in ice dance.

Records
Discipline	Most championship titles			
Discipline	Skater(s)	No.	Years	Ref.
Men's singles	Karol Divín	11	1954–64	
Women's singles	Hana Mašková	5	1965–69	
Pairs	Soňa Balunová; Miloslav Balun	6	1950–55	
Ice dance	Eva Romanová; Pavel Roman	7	1959–65	
