= Diana Skotnická =

Personal information
- Born: 1940s

Figure skating career
- Country: Czechoslovakia
- Partner: Martin Skotnický
- Coach: Ivan Mauer; Hilda Múdra; Míla Nováková
- Retired: 1974

Diana Skotnická is a figure skating coach and former ice dancer who competed for Czechoslovakia. With her brother, Martin Skotnický, she is the 1970 Winter Universiade champion and a five-time Czechoslovak national champion (1970–1974).

== Career ==
=== Competitive ===
Skotnická competed in partnership with her brother, Martin Skotnický. Their coaches included Ivan Mauer, Hilda Múdra, and Míla Nováková. The siblings took silver at the 1968 Winter Universiade in Innsbruck, Austria.

In the 1969–1970 season, Skotnická/Skotnický won the first of their five consecutive national titles and placed 11th at the World Championships in Ljubljana, Yugoslavia. They concluded their season with gold at the 1970 Winter Universiade in Rovaniemi, Finland.

Skotnická/Skotnický competed at nine ISU Championships. Their best continental result, sixth, came at the 1973 European Championships in Cologne, West Germany. A few weeks later, they would achieve their career-best world result, finishing eighth at the 1973 World Championships in Bratislava, Czechoslovakia. The two retired from competition in 1974.

=== Post-competitive ===
Skotnická began coaching in France in 1974. She was formerly based in Courbevoie. She has coached the following skaters:

- Christopher Boyadji
- Adeline Canac
- Adeline Canac / Yannick Bonheur
- Frédéric Dambier
- Candice Didier
- Jean-Michel Debay
- Stanick Jeannette
- Camille Mendoza / Christopher Boyadji
- Gabriel Monnier

== Results ==
(with Martin Skotnický)

International
Event	66–67	67–68	68–69	69–70	70–71	71–72	72–73	73–74
World Champ.				11th	12th	11th	8th	12th
European Champ.					8th	7th	6th	10th
Moscow News					4th	5th		4th
Winter Universiade		2nd		1st				
National
Czechoslovakia	6th		3rd	1st	1st	1st	1st	1st
