= Sonja Balun =

Austrian former figure skater

Personal information
- Other names: Sonja Harand
- Born: 12 December 1955 (age 70) Czechoslovakia
- Height: 1.59 m (5 ft 2 1/2 in)

Figure skating career
- Country: Austria
- Retired: 1976

Sonja Balun Harand (born 12 December 1955) is an Austrian former figure skater who competed in ladies' singles. She is a four-time Austrian national champion (1973–1976) and competed at the 1972 Winter Olympics, finishing 17th.

Born in Czechoslovakia, Balun is the daughter of the 1954 European bronze medalists in pair skating – Soňa Balunová and Miloslav Balun. The family arrived in Austria in 1967.

She married Olympic ice hockey player Kurt Harand.

== Results ==
International
Event	70–71	71–72	72–73	73–74	74–75	75–76
Winter Olympics		17th				
World Champ.	20th			16th	16th	
European Champ.	18th	17th	10th	10th	12th	
Schäfer Memorial						3rd
National
Austrian Champ.			1st	1st	1st	1st
