= Radmila Chroboková =

Czech ice dancer

Personal information
- Born: 10 August 1976 (age 49) Bohumín, Czechoslovakia
- Height: 1.67 m (5 ft 5 1/2 in)

Figure skating career
- Country: Czech Republic; Czechoslovakia; United Kingdom

Radmila Chroboková (born 10 August 1976) is a Czech former ice dancer. With Tomáš Střondala, she placed seventh at the 1992 World Junior Championships in Hull, Quebec. She teamed up with Milan Brzý later that year and represented the Czech Republic at the 1994 Winter Olympics, finishing 16th. In the 1997–98 season, Chroboková won silver with Justin Lanning at the British Championships but the duo soon parted ways.

== Competitive highlights ==
=== With Lanning for Great Britain ===
International
Event	1997–98
Josef Dedic Memorial	5th
National
British Championships	2nd

=== With Milan Brzý for the Czech Republic ===
International
Event	1991–92	1992–93	1993–94
Winter Olympics			16th
World Champ.		20th	19th
European Champ.	14th	15th	14th
NHK Trophy			7th
National
Czech Champ.			2nd

=== With Střondala for Czechoslovakia ===
International
Event	1991–92
World Junior Championships	7th
National
Czechoslovak Championships	
