= Jaroslav Suchý =

Czech former competitive figure skater (born 1971)

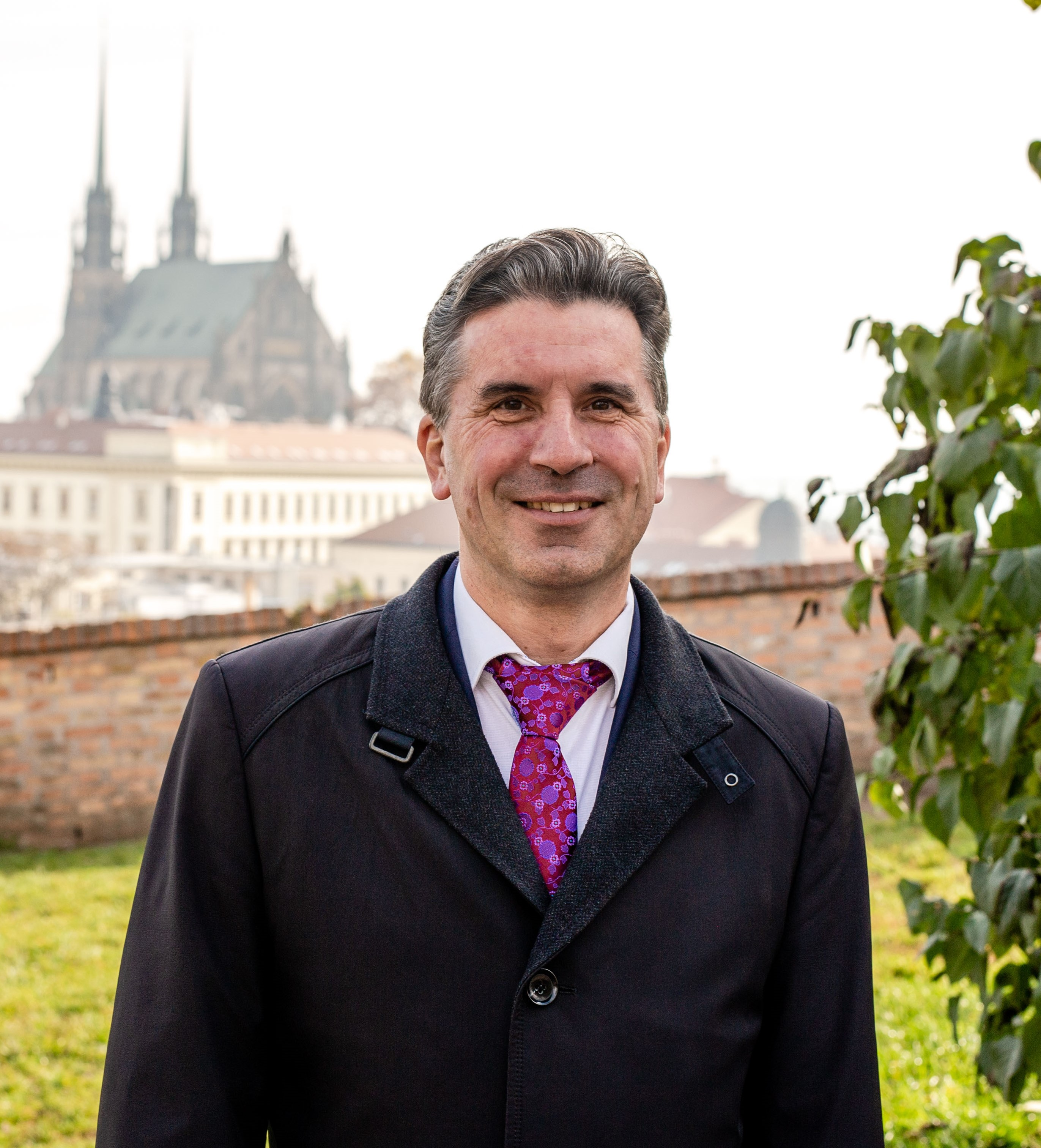

Personal information
- Born: 3 February 1971 (age 55) Brno, Czechoslovakia

Figure skating career
- Country: Czech Republic; Czechoslovakia
- Began skating: 1977
- Retired: 1997

Medal record
Representing Czechoslovakia
Czechoslovak Championships
Silver medal – second place	1986 Bratislava	Singles
Silver medal – second place	1987 Prostějov	Singles
Silver medal – second place	1988 Nitra	Singles
Silver medal – second place	1992 Ružomberok	Singles
Silver medal – second place	1993 Hradec Králové	Singles
Representing Czech Republic
Czech Championships
Gold medal – first place	1995 Ústí nad Labem	Singles
Silver medal – second place	1996 Třinec	Singles

Jaroslav Suchý (born 3 February 1971) is a Czech former competitive figure skater. Internationally, he represented Czechoslovakia until its dissolution and then the Czech Republic. He is the 1995 Czech national champion. His highest senior ISU Championship result was 13th at the 1993 European Championships in Helsinki, Finland. He began skating in 1977 and retired from competition in 1997.

Suchý graduated from Gymnázium třída Kapitána Jaroše in 1989 and from Masaryk University in 1995. He is involved in Brno municipal politics as a member of KDU–ČSL.

== Competitive highlights ==
Competition	1985–86 (TCH)	1986–87 (TCH)	1987–88 (TCH)	1988–89 (TCH)	1991–92 (TCH)	1992–93 (TCH)	1993–94 (CZE)	1994–95 (CZE)	1995–96 (CZE)
World Championships						22nd			
European Championships		21st	20th		20th	13th	31st		28th
Czechoslovak Championships	2nd	2nd	2nd		2nd	2nd			
Czech Championships								1st	2nd
Nations Cup							9th		
Prague Skate	11th	7th		5th					
Trophée Lalique						10th			
Winter Universiade						9th		16th	
World Junior Championships	7th	10th							
