= Ivan Havránek =

Czechoslovak ice dancer (born 1964)

Personal information
- Born: 10 March 1964 (age 62)

Figure skating career
- Country: Czechoslovakia
- Retired: 1988

Ivan Havránek (born 10 March 1964) is a former ice dancer who competed for Czechoslovakia. With Viera Řeháková (Mináríková), he placed ninth at the 1988 European Championships and 15th at the 1988 Winter Olympics.

His mother, Milada Havránková, was a figure skating coach in Karviná.

== Competitive highlights ==
With Řeháková (Mináríková):

International
Event	80–81	81–82	82–83	83–84	84–85	85–86	86–87	87–88
Winter Olympics								15th
World Champ.								14th
European Champ.				14th		10th	10th	9th
Prague Skate		9th		4th				3rd
NHK Trophy								WD
International: Junior
World Junior Champ.		5th						
National
Czechoslovak Champ.	3rd	3rd	2nd	2nd	2nd	1st	1st	1st
WD = Withdrew
