= Jana Mrázková =

Czech figure skater

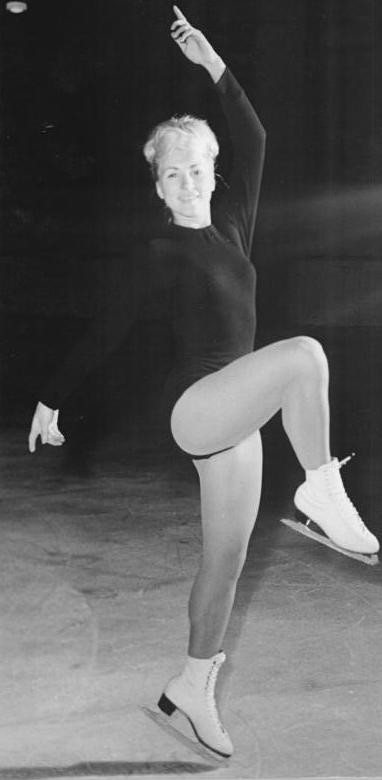
- Mrázková in 1964

Personal information
- Born: 20 March 1940 (age 86) Brno, Protectorate of Bohemia and Moravia

Figure skating career
- Country: Czechoslovakia
- Retired: 1965
Medal record
Representing Czechoslovakia
Figure skating: Ladies' singles
European Championships
Bronze medal – third place	1961 Berlin	Ladies' singles

Jana Mrázková née Dočekalová (born 20 March 1940) is a Czech former figure skater who competed in ladies' singles for Czechoslovakia. She is the 1961 European bronze medalist and appeared at two Winter Olympics, finishing fourth in 1960 and 25th in 1964. She was coached by Hilda Múdra.

== Results ==
International
Event	59–60	60–61	61–62	62–63	63–64	64–65
Winter Olympics	4th				25th	
World Champ.	6th		7th	8th		
European Champ.	5th	3rd	8th	4th	10th	8th
Prague Skate						3rd
National
Czechoslovak Champ.	1st	1st	1st	1st	1st	2nd
