= Eva Ďurišinová =

Slovak figure skater

Personal information
- Other names: Eva Križková
- Born: 20 March 1961 (age 65) Bratislava, Czechoslovakia

Figure skating career
- Country: Czechoslovakia

Eva Ďurišinová, married, Križková, (born 20 March 1961) is a Slovak former competitive figure skater. She represented Czechoslovakia at the 1976 Winter Olympics in Innsbruck, finishing 19th. She was coached by Hilda Múdra in Bratislava. She later became a coach as well, working with Alexandra Kunová.

== Competitive highlights ==
International
Event	1975–76	1976–77	1977–78	1978–79
Winter Olympics	19th			
World Champ.	18th			
European Champ.		17th		
Prague Skate		10th	7th	
National
Czechoslovak Champ.	2nd	1st	2nd	3rd
Slovak Champ.*				1st
* = Regional
