= Lenka Knapová =

Czech pair skater

Personal information
- Born: 22 March 1970 (age 56) Zlín, Czechoslovakia

Figure skating career
- Country: Czechoslovakia
- Partner: René Novotný
- Coach: Ivan Rezek
- Retired: 1988

Lenka Knapová (born 22 March 1970) is a Czech former pair skater who represented Czechoslovakia. With René Novotný, she won four Czechoslovak national titles and competed at seven ISU Championships; the pair's best result, fourth, came at the 1987 European Championships in Sarajevo, Yugoslavia. They also competed at the 1988 Winter Olympics in Calgary, Alberta, Canada, but withdrew after placing 9th in the short program. Ivan Rezek served as their coach.

Knapová had knee problems. She retired from competition in 1988.

== Competitive highlights ==
With Novotný

International
Event	1984–85	1985–86	1986–87	1987–88
Winter Olympics				WD
World Championships		10th	11th	8th
European Champ.	7th	6th	4th	6th
NHK Trophy			4th	
Skate Canada				7th
National
Czechoslovak Champ.	1st	1st	1st	1st
WD = Withdrew
