= Jaroslav Sadílek =

Czech figure skater

Personal information
- Nationality: Czech
- Born: 28 April 1913
- Died: 6 February 1993 (aged 79) Gothenburg, Sweden

Sport
- Sport: Figure skating

Jaroslav Sadílek (28 April 1913 – 6 February 1993) was a Czech figure skater. He competed in the men's singles event at the 1936 Winter Olympics.

Competition	1935	1936	1937	1938	1939
Czechoslovak Championships	3rd	2nd (Note: Jaroslav Sadilek was named the 1936 Czechoslovak champion, because Emil Ratzenhofer, the first-place finisher, was a guest skater from Austria.)	2nd		1st
