= Ľudmila Bezáková =

Slovak figure skater

Personal information
- Other names: Ľudmila Siroťáková-Bezáková
- Born: Czechoslovakia

Figure skating career
- Country: Czechoslovakia
- Retired: 1973

Ľudmila Bezáková, married name Siroťáková, is a former competitive figure skater who represented Czechoslovakia internationally. She is the 1969 Nebelhorn Trophy champion, 1972 Winter Universiade silver medalist, and a two-time Czechoslovak national champion (1970–71). Bezáková competed at three European Championships, achieving her best result, 8th, in 1970 in Leningrad. She was also sent to three World Championships with her highest placement was 11th in 1972 in Calgary. Hilda Múdra and Ivan Mauer coached her in Bratislava.

== Competitive highlights ==
International
Event	1968–69	1969–70	1970–71	1971–72	1972–73
World Champ.		17th	14th	11th	
European Champ.	13th	8th	10th		
Winter Universiade				2nd	
Prague Skate			1st		7th
Nebelhorn Trophy		1st			
Kennedy Memorial WG		7th			
National
Czechoslovak Champ.	2nd	1st	1st	2nd	DNF
Slovak*		1st			2nd
*Regional level
