= Jozef Sabovčík =

Slovak figure skater (born 1963)

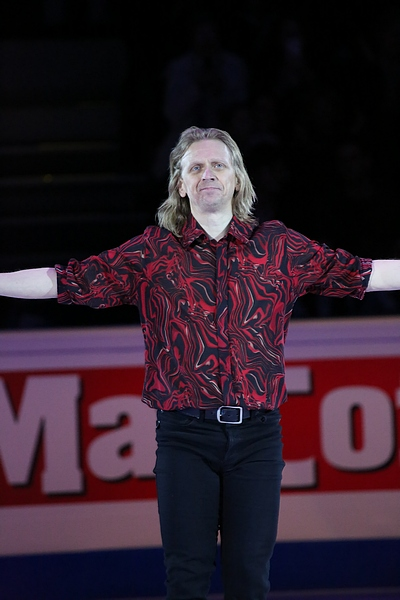
- Jozef Sabovčík

Personal information
- Born: 4 December 1963 (age 62) Bratislava, Czechoslovakia

Figure skating career
- Country: Czechoslovakia
- Coach: Agnesa Búřilová, Hilda Múdra, Lojkovičová, Anderlová
- Began skating: 1969/1970
- Retired: 1986
Medal record
Representing Czechoslovakia
Figure skating: Men's singles
Winter Olympics
Bronze medal – third place	1984 Sarajevo	Men's singles
European Championships
Gold medal – first place	1985 Gothenburg	Men's singles
Gold medal – first place	1986 Copenhagen	Men's singles
Silver medal – second place	1983 Dortmund	Men's singles

Jozef Sabovčík (nicknamed Jumping Joe; born 4 December 1963) is a Slovak figure skater who competed representing Czechoslovakia. He is the 1984 Olympic bronze medalist, a two-time European champion (1985 and 1986), and a six-time Czechoslovak national champion. His quad toe loop at the 1986 European Championships was originally approved as the first quad jump landed in competition, but a few weeks later it was deemed invalid due to a touchdown with his free foot.

== Personal life ==
Sabovčík was born on 4 December 1963 in Bratislava. His mother, Alexandra, was a ballerina of Czech descent, and his father, Jozef, a dancer and choreographer of Slovak descent. He is Catholic, speaks five languages (Slovak, Czech, English, Russian and German), and has dual Slovak and Canadian citizenship. In 2005, he stated that he did not agree with the dissolution of Czechoslovakia and still felt Czechoslovak. His first marriage was to Canadian champion Tracey Wainman, with whom he has a son named Blade, and his second marriage is to Jennifer Verili, with whom he has a son named Jozef Junior. They live in Bountiful, Utah, United States.

== Career ==
Sabovčík began skating when he was six years old. His main coach was Agnesa Búřilová but he also worked with Anderlová, Lojkovičová, and Hilda Múdra. His choreographer was Frantisek Blaťák.

Sabovčík won bronze at the 1981 Skate Canada International and 1982 Skate America. He was the silver medalist at the 1983 European Championships. Sabovčík had knee effusion before the 1984 Winter Olympics in Sarajevo. He won the bronze medal behind Scott Hamilton and Brian Orser.

Sabovčík became a two-time European champion with wins in 1985 and 1986. He also won 1985 Skate Canada International and Skate America. Sabovčík landed a quad toe loop at the 1986 European Championships. It was approved at the time as the first quad in competition but a few weeks later ruled invalid because of an alleged touchdown with his free foot.

Despite a knee injury, he had to compete at the 1986 World Championships because his federation did not believe he was really injured. He said, "It was the hardest 4½ minutes of my skating career, knowing that I had to finish, but could hardly walk, let alone skate." Having undergone three knee operations, he retired from competition in 1986.

Nicknamed "Jumping Joe", Sabovčík was known for his jumping ability and later turned it into a lucrative professional career. He is known for an excellent tuck Axel. "Sometimes there is beauty in simplicity and I think an open Axel is very beautiful. A tuck Axel is basically the same thing, but it has a little more edge to it, which is great for me, because I can use it with my rock numbers. If you noticed in my slower, quieter programs I always do an open Axel as it's better suited for that kind of music." He was disappointed by the loss of compulsory figures, saying, "In my opinion, the quality of skating itself (not jumping) has gone down. Figures taught how to use edges, like Robin Cousins and Brian Boitano still do, that with a couple of pushes they can get across the whole rink, you don't see that with the new skaters."

Sabovčík coaches skating at the Weber County Sports Complex in Utah.

== Programs ==
Some of his programs were to the following music: Trapped by Bruce Springsteen, Alone You Breathe by Savatage, and In Loving Memory by Alter Bridge.

== Results ==
International
Event	75–76	76–77	77–78	78–79	79–80	80–81	81–82	82–83	83–84	84–85	85–86
Olympics									3rd		
Worlds				19th	16th	12th	16th	6th	4th	4th	6th
Europeans				17th	9th	5th	8th	2nd	4th	1st	1st
Skate America								3rd			1st
Skate Canada							3rd				1st
NHK Trophy							WD			4th	WD
Prague Skate		9th			3rd	1st	1st	1st			
International: Junior
Junior Worlds	10th										
Grand Prize SNP	3rd	1st									
National
Czechoslovak		3rd		2nd	1st	1st	1st	1st	1st	2nd	1st
Slovak*						1st					
*Sub-national level; WD = Withdrew
