= Milena Tůmová =

Czech former ice dancer

Milena Tůmová is a Czech former ice dancer who competed for Czechoslovakia. With Josef Pešek, she became a three-time national medalist and competed at four ISU Championships. The duo finished in the top ten at the 1968 European Championships in Västerås, Sweden, and 1969 European Championships in Garmisch-Partenkirchen, West Germany. They placed 12th at the 1968 World Championships in Geneva, Switzerland. They represented Prague.

In 1954, whe she was in the youth team of the Youth Sports School, Tůmová played a small role as a figure skater in the Czechoslovak film On the Silver Mirror.

== Competitive highlights ==
(with Pešek)

International
Event	1966–67	1967–68	1968–69
World Championships		12th	
European Championships	12th	9th	9th
Prague Skate		4th	
National
Czechoslovak Championships	3rd	2nd	2nd
