= Eva Romanová =

Czech figure skater

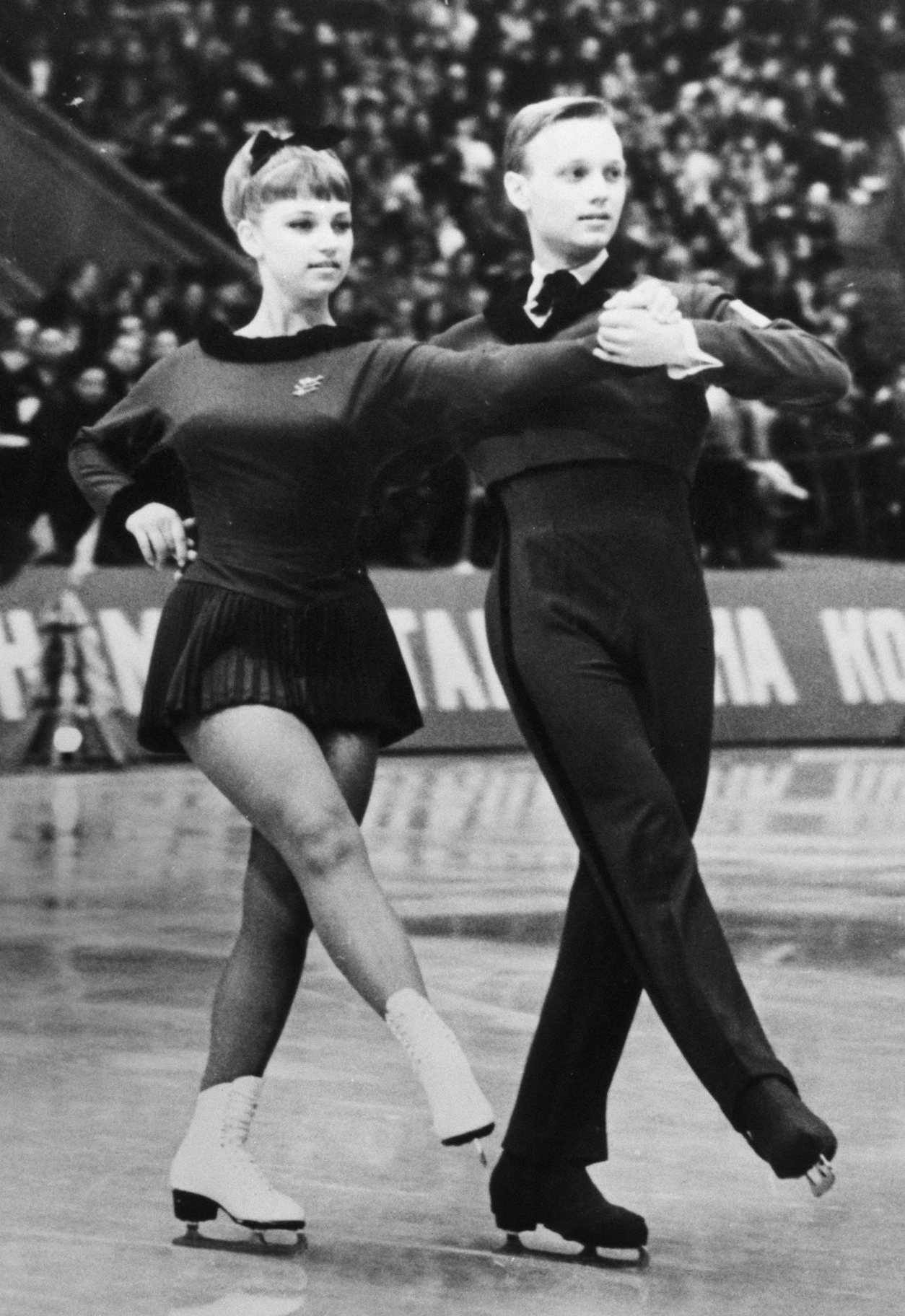
- Eva Romanová and Pavel Roman in 1965

Personal information
- Born: 27 January 1946 (age 80) Olomouc, Czechoslovakia

Figure skating career
- Country: Czechoslovakia
- Partner: Pavel Roman
- Retired: 1965
Medal record
Representing Czechoslovakia
Figure skating: Ice dancing
World Championships
Gold medal – first place	1965 Colorado Springs	Ice dancing
Gold medal – first place	1964 Dortmund	Ice dancing
Gold medal – first place	1963 Cortina d'Ampezzo	Ice dancing
Gold medal – first place	1962 Prague	Ice dancing
European Championships
Gold medal – first place	1965 Moscow	Ice dancing
Gold medal – first place	1964 Grenoble	Ice dancing
Silver medal – second place	1963 Budapest	Ice dancing
Bronze medal – third place	1962 Geneva	Ice dancing

Eva Graham, née Romanová (born 27 January 1946) is a Czech former figure skater who represented Czechoslovakia in pair skating and ice dancing with her brother Pavel Roman. As ice dancers, they became four-time World champions (1962–65) and two-time European champions (1964–65).

== Career ==
Demonstrations in figure skating at the Jaap Eden baan in Amsterdam, with a.o. Manfred Schnelldorfer; Olympic and world champion 1964, Eva Romanová/Pavel Roman, and Sjoukje Dijkstra doing her program.

The Romans started their competitive careers in pair skating rather than ice dance, placing third at the Czechoslovak Championships in 1957 and second in 1958 and 1959. They won the national ice dancing title in 1959, the first year that discipline was competed in Czechoslovakia. They competed in both disciplines at the 1959 European Championships, placing 7th in dance and 12th in pairs. After that they focused on ice dancing.

The siblings won their first world title at the 1962 World Championships in their home city of Prague, defeating their greatest rivals, Christian and Jean Paul Guhel of France. Eva was 16 years old and Pavel was 19. It was the first time non-British ice dancers won Worlds. One year later, they won the silver medal at the 1963 European Championships, behind Linda Shearman / Michael Phillips. After this competition they won every event they entered, winning the European title in 1964 and 1965, and World titles from 1962–65. Ice dancing was not yet an Olympic sport.

After retiring from competition they skated in the professional revue Holiday on Ice.

== Personal life ==
Romanová married Jackie Graham. After living in the US they returned to Great Britain. In 2000 they moved to Czech Republic due to Eva's mother's poor health. In 2006, after the death of Eva's mother they resettled in the UK where Graham died. Eva still lives in Great Britain.

== Results ==
=== Pairs with Roman ===
International
Event	1956–57	1967–58	1958–59
European Champ.			12th
National
Czechoslovakia	3rd	2nd	2nd

=== Ice dance with Roman ===
International
Event	58–59	59–60	60–61	61–62	62–63	63–64	64–65
World Champ.				1st	1st	1st	1st
European Champ.	7th	7th	5th	3rd	2nd	1st	1st
National
Czechoslovak Championships	1st	1st	1st	1st	1st	1st	1st
