= František Pechar =

Czech figure skater

Personal information
- Born: 29 August 1954 (age 71)

Figure skating career
- Country: Czechoslovakia

František Pechar (born 29 August 1954) is a Czech former figure skater who competed internationally for Czechoslovakia. He placed tenth at the 1974 European Championships and won two silver medals at the Prague Skate. Pechar later coached the 1992 Olympic bronze medalist Petr Barna and Lenka Kulovaná. He also commentated for Eurosport. In 2005, he became a member of the Audit Committee of the Czech Olympic Committee.

== Competitive highlights ==
International
Event	70–71	71–72	72–73	73–74	74–75	75–76	76–77
World Champ.					17th		
European Champ.			11th	10th			
Prague Skate	6th	5th	4th	1st	2nd	4th	2nd
National
Czechoslovak Champ.		4th	3rd	2nd	2nd		2nd
