= Petr Barna =

Czech figure skater (born 1966)

Personal information
- Born: 9 March 1966 (age 60) Prague, Czechoslovakia

Figure skating career
- Country: Czechoslovakia
- Retired: 1992
Medal record
Representing Czechoslovakia
Figure skating: Men's singles
Olympic Games
Bronze medal – third place	1992 Albertville	Singles
European Championships
Gold medal – first place	1992 Lausanne	Singles
Silver medal – second place	1990 Leningrad	Singles
Silver medal – second place	1991 Sofia	Singles
Bronze medal – third place	1989 Birmingham	Singles

Petr Barna (born 9 March 1966) is a Czech former competitive figure skater who competed for Czechoslovakia. He is the 1992 European champion, the 1992 Olympic bronze medalist, and a seven-time Czechoslovak national champion.

== Personal life ==
Barna was born 9 March 1966 in Prague. In 1990, he married ice dancer Andrea Juklová, with whom he has a daughter, Sofie Barnová, born in April 1992.

== Career ==
Barna started skating in Prague at an outdoor rink and received lessons in 1972. He began appearing at senior internationals in the 1982–83 season; he came in 18th place at the 1983 European Championships. He was coached by František Pechar. Figure skating historian James R. Hines said that Barna was a consistent skater throughout his 10-year career, continually improving in the rankings "while maintaining a relatively consistent balance between the compulsory figures and free skating".

Barna sprained his right ankle as he was leaving the airport in Birmingham on his way to the 1989 European Championships. Despite the injury, he medaled for the first time at an ISU Championship, winning bronze.

1991–92 was Barna's best competitive season. He won gold at the 1992 European Championships and a bronze medal at the 1992 Winter Olympics in Albertville, France. He landed a quad toe loop in his free skate. Furthermore, he became the first man to land a quad jump in Olympic history. He also received the first 6.0 for artistic expression in the history of the short program. He placed 4th at the 1991 World Championships, his best placement at Worlds during his career. He medaled at the Europeans between 1989 and 1992. As Hines states, his win at Europeans in 1992 was significant because he defeated Viktor Petrenko from Ukraine, which prevented Petrenko from winning all three major international titles that year. Barna also competed at the 1988 Winter Olympics, coming in 13th place.

After placing sixth at the 1992 World Championship, Barna retired from amateur competition. He then spent almost ten years as a professional skater, performing in the Champions on Ice tour and World Cup tour, as well as competing in World Professional competitions, ESPN Legends, Miko Masters, and other events. He preferred amateur competition, saying, "In amateur skating, it matters how you skate. In professional, it matters how you dance. And I don't dance. I liked amateur skating better."

Barna works as a coach in Oberstdorf, Germany, and has also appeared in several television skating programs.

== Results ==
International
Event	82–83	83–84	84–85	85–86	86–87	87–88	88–89	89–90	90–91	91–92
Olympics						13th				3rd
Worlds		16th	13th	16th	8th	8th	5th	6th	4th	6th
Europeans	18th	10th	10th	7th	8th	7th	3rd	2nd	2nd	1st
Skate America										2nd
Skate Canada								1st		
Fujifilm Trophy/ Nations Cup					1st			1st		
Inter. de Paris						1st				
NHK Trophy	10th						2nd			
Prague Skate	6th	4th	1st	1st	1st	1st	1st			
Universiade					1st					
National
Czechoslovak	2nd	2nd	1st	WD	1st	1st	1st	1st	1st	1st
WD = Withdrew
