= Karol Foltán =

Personal information
- Born: 16 April 1959 (age 67) Nové Zámky, Czechoslovakia
- Height: 1.77 m (5 ft 9 1/2 in)

Figure skating career
- Country: Czechoslovakia
- Partner: Jindra Holá; Jana Beránková
- Skating club: TV VŠ Praha
- Retired: c. 1985

Karol Foltán (born 16 April 1959) is a Slovak former ice dancer who represented Czechoslovakia. Competing with Jindra Holá, he became the 1983 Prague Skate champion, a three-time Winter Universiade medalist (silver in 1983 and 1985, bronze in 1981), and a three-time Czechoslovak national champion. The two also competed at the 1984 Winter Olympics.

== Career ==
Early in his ice dancing career, Foltán competed in partnership with Jana Beránková. The duo received the bronze medal at the Czechoslovak Championships in the 1977–1978 season.

The following season, Foltán teamed up with Jindra Holá. After taking the national bronze medal, they placed 14th at the 1979 European Championships in Zagreb, Yugoslavia, and 17th at the 1979 World Championships in Vienna, Austria. The two would finish 14th at the 1980 World Championships in Dortmund, West Germany. They received the bronze medal at the 1981 Winter Universiade in Jaca, Spain.

Holá/Foltán finished 9th at the 1983 European Championships in Dortmund and then received the silver medal at the 1983 Winter Universiade in Sofia, Bulgaria.

During their penultimate season, the duo took gold at the 1983 Prague Skate and placed 9th at the 1984 European Championships in Budapest, Hungary. In February 1984, they competed at the Winter Olympics in Sarajevo, Yugoslavia. They ranked 14th in the compulsory dances, 12th in the original set pattern dance, 13th in the free dance, and 13th overall.

Holá/Foltán's best continental result, 8th, came at the 1985 European Championships in Gothenburg, Sweden. Making their final competitive appearance, they won the silver medal at the 1985 Winter Universiade in Belluno, Italy.

== Competitive highlights ==
=== With Holá ===
International
| Event | 78–79 | 79–80 | 80–81 | 81–82 | 82–83 | 83–84 | 84–85 |
|---|---|---|---|---|---|---|---|
| Olympics | | | | | | 13th | |
| Worlds | 17th | 14th | | | | | |
| Europeans | 14th | | 13th | 12th | 9th | 9th | 8th |
| Morzine Avoriaz | | | | | 3rd | | |
| NHK Trophy | | 6th | | | 4th | | |
| Prague Skate | | 4th | 6th | 4th | | 1st | |
| Universiade | | | 3rd | | 2nd | | 2nd |
National
| Czechoslovak | 3rd | 3rd | 2nd | 2nd | 1st | 1st | 1st |

=== With Beránková ===
National
| Event | 1977–78 |
|---|---|
| Czechoslovak Championships | 3rd |
