= Hana Veselá =

Figure skating career
- Country: Czechoslovakia
- Retired: c. 1985

Hana Veselá is a former competitive figure skater who represented Czechoslovakia. She is the 1983 Winter Universiade bronze medalist and a three-time Czechoslovak national champion (1982–84). She placed 10th at the 1981 Prize of Moscow News, 12th at the 1982 European Championships in Lyon, France, and 16th at the 1983 European Championships in Dortmund, West Germany.

== Competitive highlights ==
International
Event	77–78	78–79	79–80	80–81	81–82	82–83	83–84	84–85
European Champ.					12th	16th		
Universiade						3rd		
Moscow News					10th			
Prague Skate						6th	6th	6th
National
Czechoslovak	3rd	2nd	3rd	2nd	1st	1st	1st	2nd
