= Vladislav Čáp =

Czech figure skater (1926–2001)

Personal information
- Born: 13 April 1926
- Died: 30 December 2001 (aged 75) Prague, Czech Republic

Figure skating career
- Country: Czechoslovakia
- Coach: Arnold Gerschwiler
Medal record
Representing Czechoslovakia
Figure skating: Men's singles
European Championships
| Silver medal – second place | 1947 Davos | Men's singles |

Vladislav Čáp (13 April 1926 — 30 December 2001) was a Czech figure skater who competed internationally for Czechoslovakia. He was the 1947 European silver medalist. He competed at the 1948 Winter Olympics and placed 10th.

Čáp graduated from the Czech Technical University in Prague. In 1958, he published a book on figure skating, Výklad pravidel krasobruslení. In 1959, he was arrested for alleged spying and sentenced to five years in prison. He was released after three and a half years. In 1969, he began working for Czechoslovak Television and lecturing on stage lighting at the Theatre Faculty of the Academy of Performing Arts in Prague.

== Results ==
| Event | 1946 | 1947 | 1948 | 1949 | 1950 | 1951 | 1952 | 1953 |
|---|---|---|---|---|---|---|---|---|
| Winter Olympics | | | 10th | | | | | |
| World Championships | | 4th | 10th | | | | | |
| European Championships | | 2nd | 8th | 5th | | | | |
| Czechoslovak Championships | 3rd | 3rd | 1st | 1st | 2nd | 3rd | 3rd | 2nd |
