= Hilda Múdra =

Slovak figure skating coach (1926–2021)

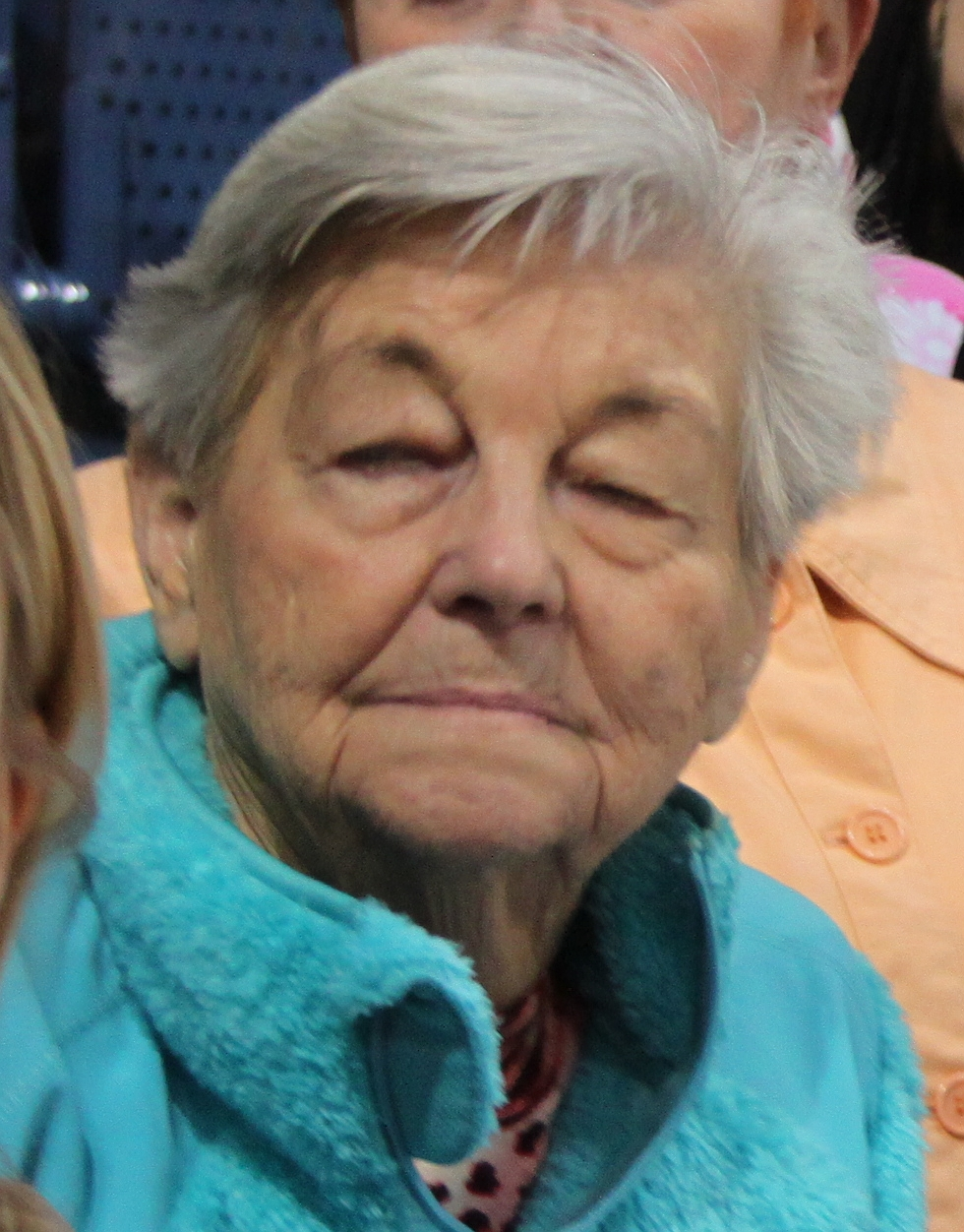
- Múdra in 2012

Personal information
- Other names: Hildegard Klimpel
- Born: 1 January 1926 Vienna, Austria
- Died: 22 November 2021 (aged 95) Bratislava, Slovakia

Hilda Múdra, née Hildegard Klimpel (1 January 1926 – 22 November 2021), was an Austrian-born Slovak figure skating coach. Her most notable student was Ondrej Nepela, the 1972 Olympic champion.

== Early life ==
Múdra was born as Hildegard Klimpel to Paul and Anna Klimpel in Vienna. Múdra was coached by Rudolf Kurtzer and Will Petters in Vienna. She trained first in single skating and then ice dancing. In the mid-1940s, she toured with an Austrian ice show which visited Czechoslovakia, and then began coaching in Bratislava.

== Career ==
The first of her students to win a medal at the European Championships was Jana Mrázková.

Múdra coached Ondrej Nepela for 15 years, having first met him in February 1958. He would win gold at five European Championships, three World Championships, and the 1972 Winter Olympics. In 2000, he was named Slovak athlete of the 20th century — Múdra accepted the award from the Slovak president, Rudolf Schuster, on behalf of her deceased student.

Múdra also worked with Jozef Sabovčík, Sanda Dubravčić, Jana Mrázková, Agnesa Wlachovská, Charlotte Walter, Martin Skotnický, Marián Filc, Eva Grožajová, Miroslav Šoška, Ľudmila Bezáková, Miljan Begović, and Eva Ďurišinová. In her 80s, she fractured vertebra as a result of a fall, preventing her from returning to the ice, but she continued to coach children from behind the boards in Dúbravka, Bratislava.

== Personal life ==
She married Slovak manager Jozef Múdry on 26 October 1947 and gave birth to their daughter, Dagmar, in 1949, and to their son, Pavol, in 1950. Her husband died in November 2010. She spoke both Slovak and German. Mudra died on 22 November 2021 at the age of 95 in Bratislava.
