= Eva Grožajová =

Figure skater

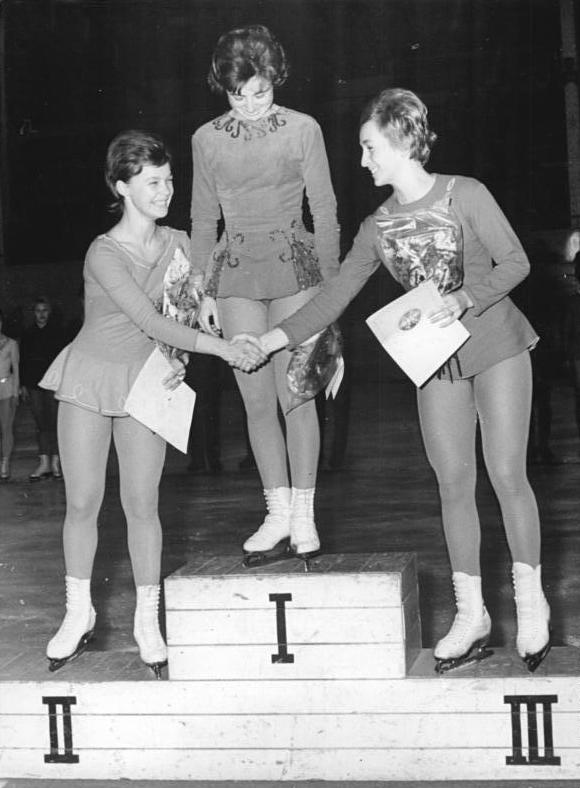
- Eva Grožajová atop the Blue Swords podium in November 1962

Personal information
- Full name: Eva Bergerová-Grožajová

Figure skating career
- Country: Czechoslovakia
- Coach: Hilda Múdra (former)

Eva Grožajová, married Bergerová-Grožajová, (died 2017) was a competitive figure skater who represented Czechoslovakia. She was the 1962 Blue Swords champion and 1960 Winter Universiade silver medalist. She placed 7th at the 1961 European Championships and 13th at the 1962 World Championships. She was coached by Hilda Múdra.

== Competitive highlights ==
International
| Event | 1959–60 | 1960–61 | 1961–62 | 1962–63 |
|---|---|---|---|---|
| World Champ. | | | 13th | 15th |
| European Champ. | | 7th | 10th | |
| Blue Swords | | | | 1st |
| Winter Universiade | 2nd | | | |
National
| Czechoslovak Champ. | | 3rd | 2nd | 2nd |
