= Soňa Balunová =

Personal information
- Other names: Soňa Buriánová; Soňa Balunová-Buriánová
- Born: 1 February 1924 Brno, Czechoslovakia
- Died: 1 February 2013 (aged 88) Vienna, Austria

Figure skating career
- Country: Czechoslovakia
- Partner: Miloslav Balun
Medal record
Representing Czechoslovakia
Figure skating: Pairs
European Championships
Bronze medal – third place	1954 Bolzano	Pairs

Soňa (Sonja) Balunová, née Buriánová (8 June 1924 — 1 February 2013) was a Czechoslovak pair skater. With Miloslav Balun, she became the 1954 European bronze medalist and a six-time national champion. She also competed in volleyball and athletics.

Balunová began working as a skating coach in Prague. She later worked in Russia (1963–1964) and Linz, Austria (three decades from 1967). She married Balun in 1950. Their daughter, Sonja Balun (born in 1955), competed for Austria in ladies' single skating.

== Competitive highlights ==
With Miloslav Balun

Event	1949	1950	1951	1952	1953	1954	1955
European Championships		6th		6th		3rd	7th
Czechoslovak Championships	2nd	1st	1st	1st	1st	1st	1st
