= Milan Brzý =

Czech ice dancer

Personal information
- Born: 7 May 1969 (age 57) Karviná, Czechoslovakia
- Height: 1.82 m (5 ft 11 1/2 in)

Figure skating career
- Country: Czech Republic; Czechoslovakia
- Retired: 1994

Milan Brzý (born 7 May 1969) is a Czech former ice dancer.

== Career ==
Early in his career, he competed for Czechoslovakia with Ivana Střondalová, placing in the top ten at the 1990 European Championships and winning the bronze medal at the 1991 Winter Universiade. Brzý teamed up with Radmila Chroboková around 1992. They represented the Czech Republic at the 1994 Winter Olympics, finishing 16th.

== Personal life ==
Brzý studied at the Silesian University, obtaining a Master's degree in January 2001. He married a former synchronized skater, Monika Brzá, and became a coach in Frýdek-Místek.

== Competitive highlights ==
=== With Radmila Chroboková for the Czech Republic ===
International
Event	1991–92	1992–93	1993–94
Winter Olympics			16th
World Champ.		20th	19th
European Champ.	14th	15th	14th
NHK Trophy			7th
National
Czech Champ.			2nd

=== With Střondalová for Czechoslovakia ===
International
Event	1987–88	1988–89	1989–90	1990–91
World Champ.			11th	
European Champ.			9th	
Winter Universiade				3rd
Internat. de Paris				5th
NHK Trophy			4th	
Prague Skate	6th		2nd	
Skate America				4th
National
Czechoslovak Champ.	3rd		1st	
