= Liana Drahová =

Slovak figure skater

Personal information
- Other names: Liana Vozárová
- Born: 22 April 1953 (age 73) Liberec, Czechoslovakia

Figure skating career
- Country: Czechoslovakia
- Retired: 1975

Liana Drahová Vozárová (born 22 April 1953 in Liberec) is a Slovak former figure skater who competed for Czechoslovakia. Competing in pairs with partner Peter Bartosiewicz, she finished in 12th place at the 1968 Winter Olympics. Later, competing as a singles skater, she won the bronze medal at the 1974 European Championships.

== Results ==
=== Pair skating with Bartosiewicz ===
International
Event	1967–68	1968–69
Winter Olympics	12th	
World Championships	10th	WD
European Championships	8th	
Prague Skate	4th	
National
Czechoslovak Champ.	1st	1st
WD = Withdrew

=== Single skating ===
International
Event	69–70	70–71	71–72	72–73	73–74	74–75
World Champ.				7th	9th	11th
European Champ.	14th	14th	12th	4th	3rd	4th
Prague Skate					4th	
Prize of Moscow News		6th				
National
Czechoslovak Champ.	2nd	2nd	1st	1st	1st	1st
