= Renata Baierová =

Czechoslovak figure skater

Figure skating career
- Country: Czechoslovakia
- Coach: Karol Divín
- Retired: c. 1980

Renata Baierová is a former competitive figure skater who represented Czechoslovakia. She is the 1979 Ennia Challenge Cup champion, 1979 Prague Skate silver medalist, and 1979 Prize of Moscow News bronze medalist. She competed at six ISU Championships, finishing in the top ten at the 1976 Junior Worlds in Megève and 1980 Europeans in Gothenburg.

Baierová finished 16th at the World Championships in 1979 and 1980. She trained at TJ Stadion Brno. Her coach was Karol Divín.

== Competitive highlights ==
International
Event	75–76	76–77	77–78	78–79	79–80	80–81
World Champ.				16th	16th	
European Champ.			11th	11th	10th	
Ennia Challenge Cup				2nd	1st	
Prague Skate		4th	5th	3rd	2nd	
Prize of Moscow News					3rd	
International: Junior
World Junior Champ.	8th					
National
Czechoslovak Champ.	3rd	2nd	1st	1st	1st	1st
