= Josef Dědič =

Czechoslovak figure skater (1924–1993)

Personal information
- Full name: Josef Dědič
- Born: June 23, 1924
- Died: 19 June 1993 (aged 68) Prague, Czech Republic

Figure skating career
- Country: Czechoslovakia

Josef Dědič (June 23, 1924 – June 19, 1993 in Prague) was a Czechoslovak figure skater and sport official. He placed 9th at the 1948 European Figure Skating Championships and retired from competitive skating in that year.

In 1949, he became a skating judge. He became an International Skating Union referee. He joined the ISU's technical committee in 1957, and served as the chairman of that committee between 1959 and 1967. From 1967 to 1984, he was a member of the ISU council representing figure skating. He served as vice president of the ISU from 1984 until his death in 1993. From 1990 to 1993, he also served as president of the Czech Figure Skating Association.

He studied at the Charles University in Prague and was a teacher by profession. He was posthumously inducted into the World Figure Skating Hall of Fame in 1998.

== Competitive highlights ==
Year	1946	1947	1948
European Championships			9th
Czechoslovak Championships	2nd	1st	3rd
