= Petr Starec =

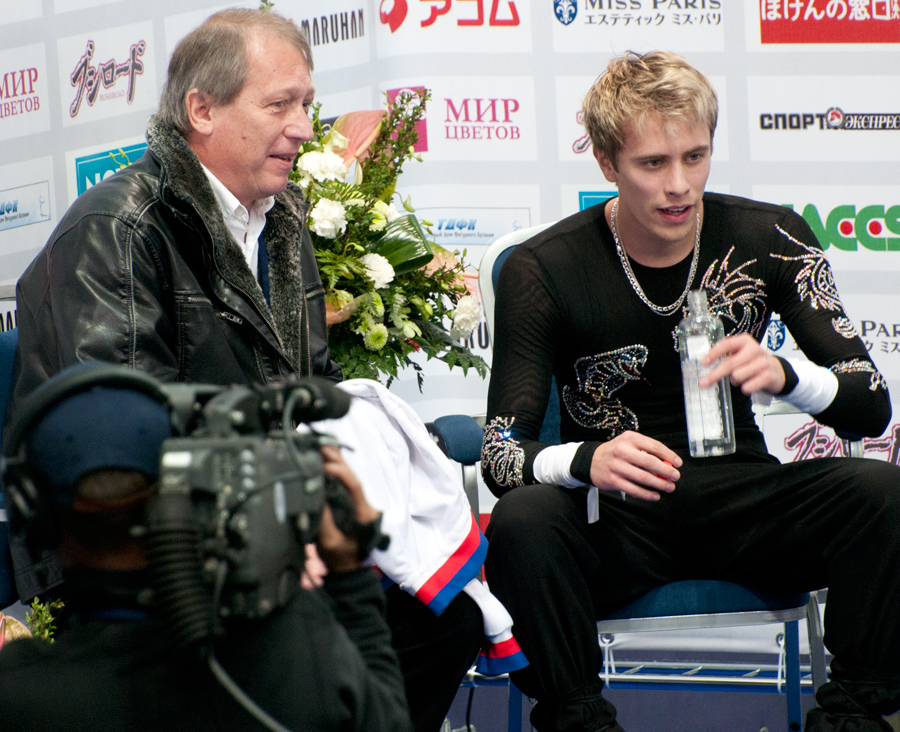
- Starec with Michal Březina at the 2011 Rostelecom Cup

Personal information
- Born: 5 December 1951 (age 74)

Figure skating career
- Country: Czechoslovakia
- Partner: Rijana Hartmanová
- Retired: 1970s

Petr Starec (Czech pronunciation: [ˈpɛtr̩ ˈstarɛts]; born 5 December 1951) is a Czech figure skating coach and former competitor. As a single skater, he became a two-time Czechoslovak national bronze medalist and competed at the 1969 European Championships in Garmisch-Partenkirchen, finishing 18th.

Starec later teamed up with Rijana Hartmanová to compete in pair skating. They won the 1974 national title and placed 13th at the 1974 European Championships in Zagreb.

Starec is the head of the Department of Sports at Masaryk University in Brno. He has coached Michal Březina (from 2004 to 2012), Eliška Březinová (until 2012), Alexandra Kunová, and Petr Kotlařík.

== Competitive highlights ==
=== Men's singles ===
Event	1967–68	1968–69
European Championships		18th
Czechoslovak Championships	3rd	3rd
Golden Spin of Zagreb	3rd	

=== Pairs with Hartmanová ===
International
Event	1972–73	1973–74	1974–75
European Championships		13th	
Blue Swords			9th
National
Czechoslovak Champ.	2nd	1st	
