= Miloslav Balun =

Personal information
- Other names: Miroslav Balun
- Born: 14 December 1920 Těšice, Czechoslovakia
- Died: 25 December 1994 (aged 74) Vienna, Austria

Figure skating career
- Country: Czechoslovakia
- Partner: Soňa Balunová
Medal record
Representing Czechoslovakia
Figure skating: Pairs
European Championships
Bronze medal – third place	1954 Bolzano	Pairs

Miloslav Balun (also credited as Miroslav Balun; 14 December 1920 – 25 December 1994) was a Czechoslovak pair skater. With Soňa Balunová, he became the 1954 European bronze medalist and a six-time national champion. He also competed in volleyball.

In 1953, Balun began working as a skating coach in Prague. He later worked in Russia (1963–1964) and Linz, Austria (from 1967). He married Balunová in 1950. Their daughter, Sonja Balun (born in 1955), competed for Austria in ladies' single skating.

== Competitive highlights ==
With Soňa Balunová

International
Event	1950	1951	1952	1953	1954	1955
European Championships	6th		6th		3rd	7th
National
Czechoslovak Championships	1st	1st	1st	1st	1st	1st
