= Viera Řeháková =

Personal information
- Other names: Věra Mináríková; Věra Řeháková
- Born: 9 November 1964 (age 61)

Figure skating career
- Country: Czechoslovakia
- Retired: 1988

Viera Řeháková, née Mináríková (born 9 November 1964) is a former ice dancer who competed for Czechoslovakia. With Ivan Havránek, she placed ninth at the 1988 European Championships and 15th at the 1988 Winter Olympics.

== Competitive highlights ==
With Havránek:

International
Event	80–81	81–82	82–83	83–84	84–85	85–86	86–87	87–88
Winter Olympics								15th
World Champ.								14th
European Champ.				14th		10th	10th	9th
Prague Skate		9th		4th				3rd
NHK Trophy								WD
International: Junior
World Junior Champ.		5th						
National
Czechoslovak Champ.	3rd	3rd	2nd	2nd	2nd	1st	1st	1st
WD = Withdrew
