= Jindra Holá =

Czech ice dancer

Personal information
- Born: 2 October 1960 (age 65) Prague, Czechoslovakia
- Height: 1.63 m (5 ft 4 in)

Figure skating career
- Country: Czechoslovakia
- Partner: Karol Foltán; Jiří Pokorný
- Skating club: USK Praha
- Retired: c. 1985

Jindra Holá (born 2 October 1960) is a Czech former ice dancer who represented Czechoslovakia. Competing with Karol Foltán, she became the 1983 Prague Skate champion, a three-time Winter Universiade medalist (silver in 1983 and 1985, bronze in 1981), and a three-time Czechoslovak national champion. The two also competed at the 1984 Winter Olympics.

== Career ==
Early in her ice dancing career, Holá competed in partnership with Jiří Pokorný. The duo won the silver medal at the Czechoslovak Championships in the 1977–1978 season.

The following season, Holá teamed up with Karol Foltán. After taking the national bronze medal, they placed 14th at the 1979 European Championships in Zagreb, Yugoslavia, and 17th at the 1979 World Championships in Vienna, Austria. The two would finish 14th at the 1980 World Championships in Dortmund, West Germany. They received the bronze medal at the 1981 Winter Universiade in Jaca, Spain.

Holá/Foltán finished 9th at the 1983 European Championships in Dortmund and then received the silver medal at the 1983 Winter Universiade in Sofia, Bulgaria.

During their penultimate season, the duo took gold at the 1983 Prague Skate and placed 9th at the 1984 European Championships in Budapest, Hungary. In February 1984, they competed at the Winter Olympics in Sarajevo, Yugoslavia. They ranked 14th in the compulsory dances, 12th in the original set pattern dance, 13th in the free dance, and 13th overall.

Holá/Foltán's best continental result, 8th, came at the 1985 European Championships in Gothenburg, Sweden. Making their final competitive appearance, they won the silver medal at the 1985 Winter Universiade in Belluno, Italy.

== Competitive highlights ==
=== With Foltán ===
International
Event	78–79	79–80	80–81	81–82	82–83	83–84	84–85
Olympics						13th	
Worlds	17th	14th					
Europeans	14th		13th	12th	9th	9th	8th
Morzine Avoriaz					3rd		
NHK Trophy		6th			4th		
Prague Skate		4th	6th	4th		1st	
Universiade			3rd		2nd		2nd
National
Czechoslovak	3rd	3rd	2nd	2nd	1st	1st	1st

=== With Pokorný ===
National
Event	1977–78
Czechoslovak Championships	2nd
