= Hana Knapová =

Personal information
- Born: c. 1956 (age 69–70)

Figure skating career
- Country: Czechoslovakia
- Retired: c. 1976

Hana Knapová (born c. 1956) is a Czechoslovak former competitive figure skater. She won gold at the 1971 Prague Skate ahead of Anett Pötzsch and silver at the same event in 1974. She finished in the top twelve at two European Championships – 1974 (Zagreb, Yugoslovia) and 1976 (Geneva, Switzerland). She also appeared at the World Championships.

== Competitive highlights ==
International
Event	70–71	71–72	72–73	73–74	74–75	75–76
World Champ.				19th	18th	
European Champ.		19th		12th	13th	12th
Prague Skate	12th	1st		8th	2nd	
Prize of Moscow News				6th		5th
National
Czechoslovak Champ.		4th	2nd	WD	2nd	1st
