= Jozef Žídek =

Slovak former figure skater

Jozef Žídek is a Slovak former figure skater who represented Czechoslovakia. He won the Czechoslovak national title in the 1969–70 season and would compete at five ISU Championships. His best result, 12th, came at the 1971 European Championships in Zürich, Switzerland. His skating club was KŠK Slovan Bratislava.

== Competitive highlights ==
International
| Event | 1969–70 | 1970–71 | 1971–72 |
|---|---|---|---|
| World Championships | 18th | 16th | 16th |
| European Championships | 16th | 12th | |
| Kennedy Memorial Winter Games | 8th | | |
| Prague Skate | | 7th | 4th |
| Prize of Moscow News | | | 7th |
National
| Czechoslovak Championships | 1st | 3rd | 3rd |
