= Marián Filc =

Czechoslovak figure skater

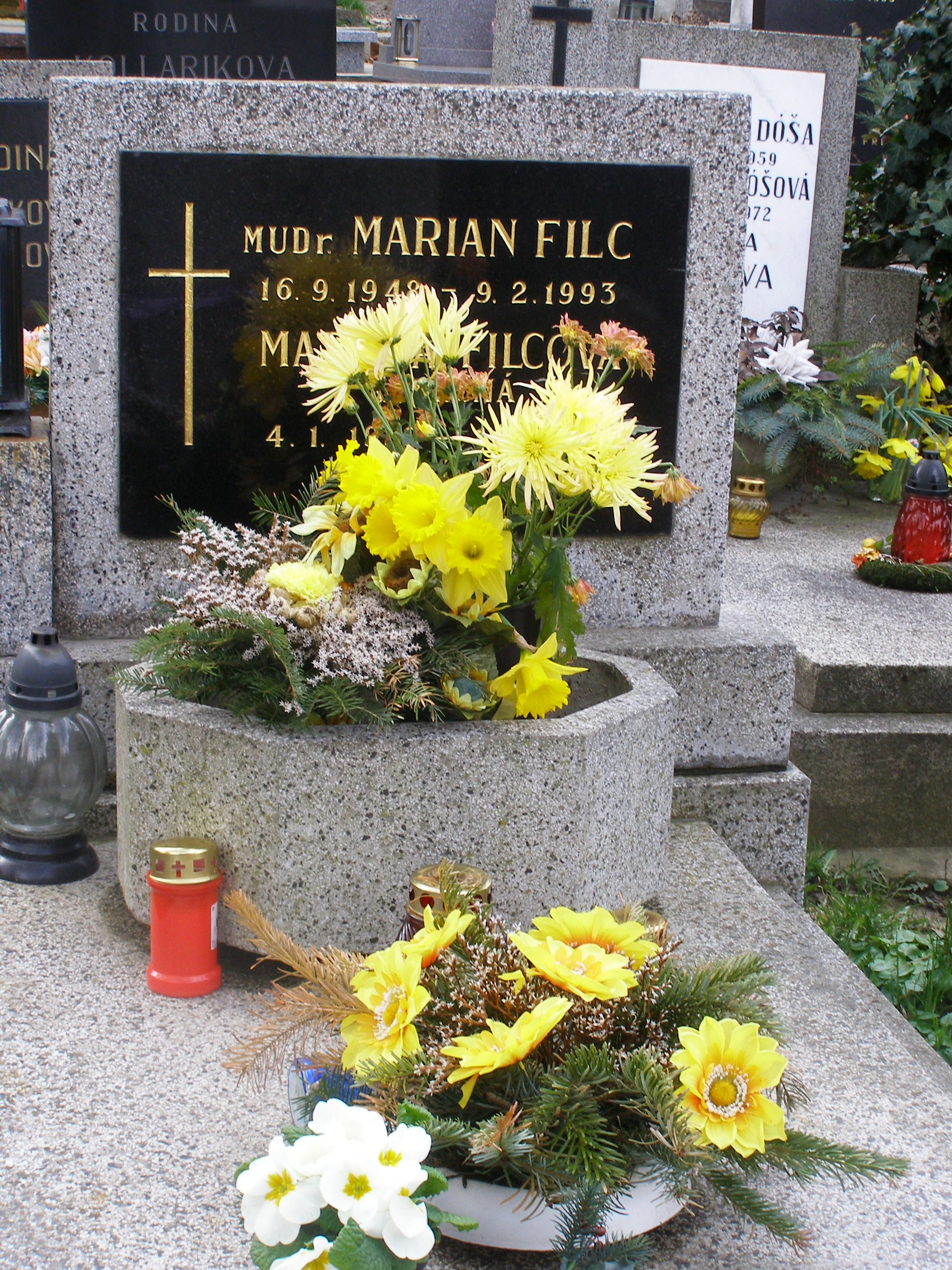
- Grave of Marián Filc in Slávičie údolie cemetery

Personal information
- Born: 16 September 1948 Bratislava, Czechoslovakia
- Died: 9 February 1993 (aged 44) Vienna, Austria
- Height: 1.76 m (5 ft 9 in)

Figure skating career
- Country: Czechoslovakia

Marián Filc (16 September 1948 — 9 February 1993) was a Slovak figure skater who competed for Czechoslovakia. He placed tenth at the 1968 Winter Olympics. His coach was Hilda Múdra.

Filc later worked as a dentist in Austria. While recovering from the flu, he suffered a heart attack and died. He was the brother of hockey player and coach Ján Filc.

== Competitive highlights ==
International
Event	62–63	63–64	64–65	65–66	66–67	67–68	68–69
Winter Olympics						10th	
World Championships					14th	15th	9th
European Champ.	21st		13th	8th	10th	7th	8th
Winter Universiade						2nd	
Prague Skate			7th	6th	5th	3rd	
Prize of Moscow News						1st	
National
Czechoslovak Champ.	3rd		2nd	2nd	2nd	2nd	2nd
