= Zdeněk Fikar =

Czechoslovak figure skater

Personal information
- Born: 18 May 1926 Prague, Czechoslovakia

Figure skating career
- Country: Czechoslovakia
- Retired: 1954

Zdeněk Fikar (born 18 May 1926) is a former figure skater. He represented Czechoslovakia at the 1948 Winter Olympics in St. Moritz, Switzerland and finished 13th. Fikar also competed at one World and six European Championships. His best result, fourth, came at the 1950 European Championships in Oslo, Norway.

== Competitive highlights ==
Event	1946	1947	1948	1949	1950	1951	1952	1953	1954
Winter Olympics			13th						
World Championships			12th						
European Championships		5th	6th	6th	4th		7th		7th
Czechoslovak Championships	1st	2nd	2nd	2nd	1st	1st	1st	1st	2nd
