= Peter Bartosiewicz =

Slovak figure skater

Personal information
- Born: 2 August 1942 (age 83) Žilina, Slovak Republic

Figure skating career
- Country: Czechoslovakia

Peter Bartosiewicz (born 2 August 1942, in Žilina) is a former pair skater who competed for Czechoslovakia. With partner Agnesa Wlachovská, he finished 9th at the 1964 Winter Olympics. He later teamed with Liana Drahová, with whom he was 12th at the 1968 Winter Olympics.

== Results ==
=== With Wlachovská ===
International
| Event | 1962–63 | 1963–64 | 1964–65 | 1965–66 |
|---|---|---|---|---|
| Winter Olympics | | 9th | | |
| World Championships | | 10th | | 10th |
| European Championships | 7th | 8th | 8th | 13th |
| Winter Universiade | | | | 2nd |
| Prague Skate | | | 2nd | |
National
| Czechoslovak Champ. | | 1st | 1st | 1st |

=== With Drahová ===
International
| Event | 1967–68 | 1968–69 |
|---|---|---|
| Winter Olympics | 12th | |
| World Championships | 10th | WD |
| European Championships | 8th | |
| Prague Skate | 4th | |
National
| Czechoslovak Champ. | 1st | 1st |
WD = Withdrew
