= Jaroslav Votruba =

Czech former pair skater (born 1939)

Personal information
- Born: 1 April 1939 (age 87) Plzeň, Protectorate of Bohemia and Moravia
- Height: 1.80 m (5 ft 11 in)

Figure skating career
- Country: Czechoslovakia
- Partner: Milada Kubíková
- Retired: 1964

Jaroslav Votruba (born 1 April 1939) is a Czech former pair skater who competed for Czechoslovakia. With skating partner Milada Kubíková, he placed 5th at two World Championships and 10th at the 1964 Winter Olympics in Innsbruck, Austria.

== Life and career ==
Votruba was born on 1 April 1939 in Plzeň, Protectorate of Bohemia and Moravia. He teamed up with Milada Kubíková by the 1958–59 season.

The pair placed seventh at their first major event, the 1962 European Championships in Geneva, Switzerland, and then fifth at the 1962 World Championships in Prague, Czechoslovakia.

Kubíková/Votruba had their best season in 1962–63. They placed 5th at the 1963 European Championships in Budapest, Hungary, and achieved the same result at the 1963 World Championships in Cortina d'Ampezzo, Italy.

Kubíková/Votruba finished 12th at the 1964 European Championships in Grenoble, France, and 10th at the 1964 Winter Olympics in Innsbruck, Austria.

Czechoslovak authorities destroyed footage of Kubíková/Votruba's performances following her defection, although Votruba stayed. The pair was named one of Plzeň's ten "Sport Stars of the 20th Century" at a gala on 17 February 2001.

== Competitive highlights ==
With Kubíková

International
Event	58–59	59–60	60–61	61–62	62–63	63–64
Winter Olympics						10th
World Championships				5th	5th	
European Champ.				7th	5th	12th
National
Czechoslovak Champ.	3rd	3rd	2nd	1st	1st	
