= Marie Millikan =

Czech former competitive figure skater

Marie Víchová
Personal information
- Other names: Marie Millikan
- Born: October 9, 1948 (age 77) Prague, Czechoslovakia
- Height: 1.67 m (5 ft 5 1/2 in)

Figure skating career
- Country: Czechoslovakia
- Retired: c. 1968

Marie Millikan, née Víchová, (born October 9, 1948) is a former competitive figure skater who represented Czechoslovakia at the 1968 Winter Olympics.

== Personal life ==
Marie Víchová was born on October 9, 1948, in Prague, Czechoslovakia. She settled in the United States after her first marriage and married her second husband, Terry Millikan, in the first half of the 1970s. She has two daughters, Michelle and Melissa.

== Career ==
Competing in her first major events, Víchová placed 16th at the 1967 European Championships in Ljubljana, Yugoslavia, and 16th at the 1967 World Championships in Vienna, Austria.

The following season, Víchová placed 13th at the 1968 European Championships in Västerås, Sweden, before competing at the 1968 Winter Olympics in Grenoble, France. At the Olympics, she ranked 20th in compulsory figures, 16th in free skating, and 21st overall. Making her final amateur appearance, she finished 14th at the 1968 World Championships in Geneva, Switzerland.

After retiring from competition, Víchová skated professionally for Holiday on Ice, performing in Europe, South America, and East Asia. She began coaching in Indiana in the 1970s. In 2005, she became the skating director at Carmel Ice Skadium.

Millikan has also worked as a figure skating analyst for the Associated Press. She covered eight Winter Olympics for the agency.

== Competitive highlights ==
International
Event	1965–66	1966–67	1967–68
Winter Olympics			21st
World Championships		16th	14th
European Championships		16th	13th
Prize of Moscow News		5th	
Prague Skate		9th	
National
Czechoslovak Champ.	3rd	2nd	2nd
