= Martin Skotnický =

Slovak ice dancing coach (born 1947)

Personal information
- Born: 24 August 1947 (age 79) Bratislava, Czechoslovakia

Figure skating career
- Country: Czechoslovakia
- Partner: Diana Skotnická
- Coach: Ivan Mauer, Hilda Múdra, Míla Nováková
- Retired: 1974

Martin Skotnický (born 24 August 1947) is a Slovak ice dancing coach and former competitor for Czechoslovakia. With his sister, Diana Skotnická, he is the 1970 Winter Universiade champion and a five-time Czechoslovak national champion (1970–74). They placed sixth at the 1973 European Championships.

== Personal life ==
Skotnický was born on 24 August 1947. He has Slovak and French citizenship. He is the brother of Diana Skotnická. He is married to Bruni Skotnicky, who competed in pair skating for Germany as Brunhilde Baßler.

== Career ==
=== Competitive ===
Skotnický switched from single skating to ice dancing after a fracture. He teamed up with his sister, Diana Skotnická. Their coaches included Ivan Mauer, Hilda Múdra, and Míla Nováková. The siblings took silver at the 1968 Winter Universiade in Innsbruck, Austria.

In the 1969–1970 season, Skotnická/Skotnický won the first of their five consecutive national titles and placed 11th at the World Championships in Ljubljana, Yugoslavia. They concluded their season with gold at the 1970 Winter Universiade in Rovaniemi, Finland.

Skotnická/Skotnický competed at nine ISU Championships. Their best continental result, sixth, came at the 1973 European Championships in Cologne, West Germany. A few weeks later, they would achieve their career-best world result, finishing eighth at the 1973 World Championships in Bratislava, Czechoslovakia. The two retired from competition in 1974.

=== Post-competitive ===
In 1975, Skotnický became director of a figure skating rink in Metz, France. In the early 1980s, he was an assistant coach for British ice dancers Jayne Torvill / Christopher Dean. He now coaches in Oberstdorf, Germany. He has worked with:

- Isabelle Duchesnay / Paul Duchesnay
- Susanna Rahkamo / Petri Kokko
- Nelli Zhiganshina / Alexander Gazsi
- Kati Winkler / René Lohse
- Christina Beier / William Beier
- Petra Born / Rainer Schönborn
- Jennifer Goolsbee / Hendryk Schamberger
- Claudia Leistner
- Tanja Kolbe / Stefano Caruso

== Results ==
(with Diana Skotnická)

International
Event	66–67	67–68	68–69	69–70	70–71	71–72	72–73	73–74
World Champ.				11th	12th	11th	8th	12th
European Champ.					8th	7th	6th	10th
Moscow News					4th	5th		4th
Winter Universiade		2nd		1st				
National
Czechoslovakia	6th		3rd	1st	1st	1st	1st	1st
