= Ivana Střondalová =

Figure skating career
- Country: Czechoslovakia

Ivana Střondalová is a former ice dancer who competed for Czechoslovakia. With partner Milan Brzý, she placed in the top ten at the 1990 European Championships and won the bronze medal at the 1991 Winter Universiade. She studied at the Silesian University.

== Competitive highlights ==
(with Brzý)

International
Event	1987–88	1988–89	1989–90	1990–91
World Champ.			11th	
European Champ.			9th	
Winter Universiade				3rd
Internat. de Paris				5th
NHK Trophy			4th	
Prague Skate	6th		2nd	
Skate America				4th
National
Czechoslovak Champ.	3rd		1st	
