= Rastislav Vnučko =

Slovak figure skater

Personal information
- Born: 21 January 1975 (age 51) Czechoslovakia

Figure skating career
- Country: Slovakia; Czechoslovakia
- Retired: 1996

Rastislav Vnučko (born 21 January 1975) is a Slovak former competitive figure skater. He is a three-time Slovak national champion. Internationally, he represented Czechoslovakia until its dissolution and then Slovakia. He was coached by Vladimír Dvojnikov in Bratislava. After retiring from competition, Vnučko became a skating coach. He works in Sweden.

== Competitive highlights ==
International
Event	1990–91 (TCH)	1991–92 (TCH)	1992–93 (TCH) (SVK)	1993–94 (SVK)	1994–95 (SVK)	1995–96 (SVK)
Worlds			25th	FNR		
Europeans		24th	21st	21st	27th	
Finlandia Trophy						13th
Schäfer Memorial					15th	13th
International: Junior
Junior Worlds	FNR					
National
Czechoslovak						
Slovak		1st	1st	1st		
FNR = Final not reached
