= Miroslav Šoška =

Slovak former figure skater

Figure skating career
- Country: Czechoslovakia
- Retired: 1980

Miroslav Šoška is a Slovak former figure skater who represented Czechoslovakia internationally. He won silver at the 1977 Prague Skate and bronze at the 1978 Rotary Watches International. Šoška competed at five European and two World Championships, achieving his best result, eighth, at the 1978 European Championships in Strasbourg. He was coached by Hilda Múdra in Bratislava.

== Competitive highlights ==
International
| Event | 72–73 | 73–74 | 74–75 | 75–76 | 76–77 | 77–78 | 78–79 | 79–80 |
|---|---|---|---|---|---|---|---|---|
| Worlds | 18th | 17th | | | | | | |
| Europeans | | | 14th | 12th | 9th | 8th | 9th | |
| Prague Skate | | 7th | 7th | 5th | 4th | 2nd | 5th | |
| Rotary Watches | | | | | | | 3rd | |
National
| Czechoslovak | 4th | 3rd | 3rd | 1st | 1st | 1st | 1st | 2nd |
| Slovak* | 3rd | | | | | | 1st | |
*Regional level; WD = Withdrew
