= Josef Pešek =

Josef Pešek is a former ice dancer who competed for Czechoslovakia. With Milena Tůmová, he became a three-time national medalist and competed at four ISU Championships. The duo finished in the top ten at the 1968 European Championships in Västerås, Sweden, and 1969 European Championships in Garmisch-Partenkirchen, West Germany. They placed 12th at the 1968 World Championships in Geneva, Switzerland. They represented Prague.

== Competitive highlights ==
(with Tůmová)

International
Event	1966–67	1967–68	1968–69
World Championships		12th	
European Championships	12th	9th	9th
Prague Skate		4th	
National
Czechoslovak Championships	3rd	2nd	2nd
