= René Novotný =

Czech former competitive pair skater (born 1963)

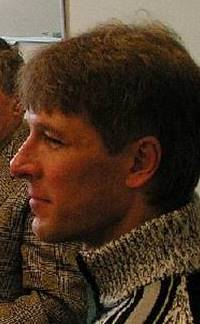
- Novotný in 2006

Personal information
- Born: 10 June 1963 (age 63) Brno, Czechoslovakia
- Height: 1.86 m (6 ft 1 in)

Figure skating career
- Country: Czech Republic; Czechoslovakia
- Retired: 1995
Medal record
Representing Czech Republic Czechoslovakia (until 1993)
Figure skating: Pairs
World Championships
Gold medal – first place	1995 Birmingham	Pairs
Silver medal – second place	1992 Oakland	Pairs
European Championships
Silver medal – second place	1995 Dortmund	Pairs

René Novotný (born 10 June 1963) is a Czech former competitive pair skater. With Radka Kovaříková, he is the 1995 World champion and 1995 European silver medalist.

== Personal life ==
Novotný was born on 10 June 1963 in Brno. He was married to Radka Kovaříková from 1996 to 2010. His second wife is named Soňa.

== Skating career until 1988 ==
Novotný skated with Ingrid Ženatá from the late 1970s until 1981. Their partnership ended because she had spinal problems.

=== Partnership with Havlová ===
Novotný's next partner was Jana Havlová. After winning bronze at the 1982 Prague Skate, they won the Czechoslovak national title. They went on to compete at two ISU Championships, placing 9th at the 1983 Europeans in Dortmund and 15th at the 1983 Worlds in Helsinki. Havlová struggled with ankle injuries. The partnership ended in 1984.

=== Partnership with Knapová ===
In 1984, Novotný teamed up with Lenka Knapová. The pair won four Czechoslovak national titles and competed at seven ISU Championships; their best result, fourth, came at the 1987 European Championships in Sarajevo, Yugoslavia. They also competed at the 1988 Winter Olympics in Calgary, Alberta, Canada, but withdrew after placing 9th in the short program. Ivan Rezek served as their coach.

Making their final appearance together, Knapová/Novotný placed 8th at the 1988 World Championships in Budapest, Hungary. She retired due to knee problems.

== Partnership with Kovaříková ==
Novotný teamed up with Radka Kovaříková in 1988.

=== 1989–1990 season ===
They won the 1989 Prague Skate and took bronze at three events – the 1989 Nebelhorn Trophy, 1989 Grand Prix International de Paris, and 1989 Skate Electric. The pair placed sixth at the 1990 European Championships in Leningrad, Soviet Union, and 8th at the 1990 World Championships in Halifax, Nova Scotia, Canada.

=== 1990–1991 season ===
Kovaříková/Novotný won silver at the 1990 Skate America, bronze at the 1990 Nations Cup, and bronze at the 1990 Skate Electric. They placed fourth at the 1991 European Championships in Sofia, Bulgaria, and sixth at the 1991 World Championships in Munich, Germany.

=== 1991–1992 season ===
Kovaříková/Novotný received the silver medal at the 1991 Grand Prix International de Paris, bronze at the 1991 Nations Cup, and silver at the 1991 NHK Trophy. They placed third in the short program, fourth in the free skate, and fourth overall at the 1992 European Championships in Lausanne, Switzerland. They finished fourth at the 1992 Winter Olympics in Albertville, France, having ranked fourth in both segments.

They concluded their third season at the 1992 World Championships in Oakland, California. Ranked third after the short program, they overtook Canada's Isabelle Brasseur / Lloyd Eisler for the silver medal behind Natalia Mishkutionok / Artur Dmitriev (CIS). They were coached by Ivan Rezek until the end of the season.

=== 1992–1993 season ===
In autumn 1992, Kovaříková/Novotný moved to train in the United States, choosing Irina Rodnina as their coach. They took silver at two events, the 1992 Skate America and 1992 Grand Prix International de Paris. Ranked fifth in the short and third in the free, they finished fourth at the 1993 European Championships in Helsinki, Finland. They placed sixth in the short, fourth in the free, and fourth overall at the 1993 World Championships in Prague, Czech Republic.

=== 1993–1994 season ===
Kovaříková/Novotný received silver medals at the 1993 Skate Canada International and 1993 NHK Trophy. They placed third in the short program and fourth in the free skate at the European Championships in Copenhagen, Denmark; they finished just off the podium for the fourth consecutive year.

In February 1994, they placed sixth at the 1994 Winter Olympics in Hamar, Norway, having ranked fifth in the short and sixth in the free. They ended their season with a 5th-place result at the 1994 World Championships in Chiba, Japan.

=== 1994–1995 season ===
Kovaříková/Novotný won bronze at the 1994 Skate America and silver at the 1994 NHK Trophy. At the 1995 European Championships in Dortmund, Germany, the pair placed first in the short program and second in the free skate. They received the silver medal behind Germany's Mandy Wötzel / Ingo Steuer. Ranked first in both segments, they won gold at the 1995 World Championships in Birmingham, England, ahead of Russia's Evgenia Shishkova / Vadim Naumov.

=== Professional career ===
Kovaříková/Novotný turned professional in 1995. They would win the World Professional Championships in 1995 and 1997. The pair toured with Stars on Ice for one season (1996–97) and continued to skate in shows around the world for a number of years.

== Political career ==
In 2014, Novotný was elected to Brno's city council as a member of ANO 2011. He was elected mayor of Brno-Židenice on 5 November 2014.

== Results ==
=== With Kovařiková ===
International
Event	88–89	89–90	90–91	91–92	92–93	93–94	94–95
Winter Olympics				4th		6th	
World Champ.		8th	6th	2nd	4th	5th	1st
European Champ.		6th	4th	4th	4th	4th	2nd
Skate America			2nd		2nd		3rd
Skate Canada						2nd	
Int. de Paris / Trophée de France		3rd		2nd	2nd		4th
NHK Trophy			6th	2nd		2nd	2nd
Nations Cup			3rd	3rd			
Nebelhorn Trophy		3rd					
Prague Skate		1st					
Skate Electric		3rd	3rd				
National
Czech Republic						1st	
Czechoslovakia	1st	1st					

International
Event	1995	1997
World Professional Championships	1st	1st

=== With Knapová ===
International
Event	1984–85	1985–86	1986–87	1987–88
Winter Olympics				WD
World Championships		10th	11th	8th
European Champ.	7th	6th	4th	6th
NHK Trophy			4th	
Skate Canada				7th
National
Czechoslovak Champ.	1st	1st	1st	1st
WD = Withdrew

=== With Havlová ===
International
Event	1982–83	1983–84
World Championships	15th	
European Championships	9th	
Prague Skate	3rd	
National
Czechoslovak Champ.	1st	2nd

=== With Ženatá ===
International
Event	1978–79	1979–80	1980–81
Prague Skate		7th	3rd
International: Junior
World Junior Champ.	10th		
Grand Prize SNP		1st	
National
Czechoslovak Champ.		3rd	
