= Libuše Veselá =

Czech figure skater

- Born: Libuše Friedrichová; 3 October 1900; Nový Bydžov, Austria-Hungary
- Died: 12 August 1973 (aged 72); Kolín, Czechoslovakia

Figure skating career
- Country: Czechoslovakia

Libuše Friedrichová-Veselá (3 October 1900 – 12 August 1973) was a Czech figure skater. She competed in the mixed pairs event at the 1928 Winter Olympics, along with husband Vojtěch Veselý.
