= Lenka Kulovaná =

Czech figure skater

Personal information
- Other names: Lenka Petit
- Born: 25 October 1974 (age 51) Ústí nad Labem, Czechoslovakia
- Height: 1.70 m (5 ft 7 in)

Figure skating career
- Country: Czech Republic; Czechoslovakia
- Skating club: USK Praha
- Began skating: 1979
- Retired: 1998

Lenka Kulovaná (born 25 October 1974) is a Czech former competitive figure skater. She is a three-time Prague Skate champion, the 1990 International de Paris silver medalist, and a three-time Czech national champion.

== Personal life ==
Kulovaná was born on 25 October 1974 in Ústí nad Labem, Czechoslovakia. She has a son, Daniel, with her husband, Emmanuel Petit, a French farrier.

== Career ==
Kulovaná won gold at the 1990, 1994, and 1995 Prague Skate (Czech Skate). She took silver at the 1990 International de Paris and the 1995 Nebelhorn Trophy.

Kulovaná placed fifth at the 1992 European Championships, tenth at the 1993 World Championships, and competed at three Winter Olympics, placing 11th in 1992, 13th in 1994 and 18th in 1998. She was coached by František Pechar, Eva Horklová, and Vlasta Kopřivová in Prague.

Kulovaná retired following the 1998 World Championships. After three years performing for Holiday on Ice, she coached skating in the United Arab Emirates, spent some time in Madagascar, and then returned to Ústí nad Labem.

== Programs ==
Season	Short program	Free skating
1997–98		Carmen by Georges Bizet, Paco de Lucía

== Results ==
GP: Champions Series (Grand Prix)

International
Event	88–89 (CS)	89–90 (CS)	90–91 (CS)	91–92 (CS)	92–93 (CZE)	93–94 (CZE)	94–95 (CZE)	95–96 (CZE)	96–97 (CZE)	97–98 (CZE)
Olympics				11th		13th				18th
Worlds			15th		10th	16th		16th	16th	15th
Europeans		17th	6th	5th	11th			13th	11th	
GP Nations Cup									10th	
GP Skate America									8th	
Centennial on Ice								9th		
Int. de Paris			2nd	6th	10th					
Nations Cup		7th		6th	6th					
Nebelhorn Trophy								2nd		
Prague Skate		6th	1st		4th		1st	1st		
International: Junior
Junior Worlds	13th		5th							
National
Czech Champ.		1st	1st	1st	1st	3rd	2nd	1st	1st	1st
