= France Avčin =

Slovene electrical engineer and mountain safety expert

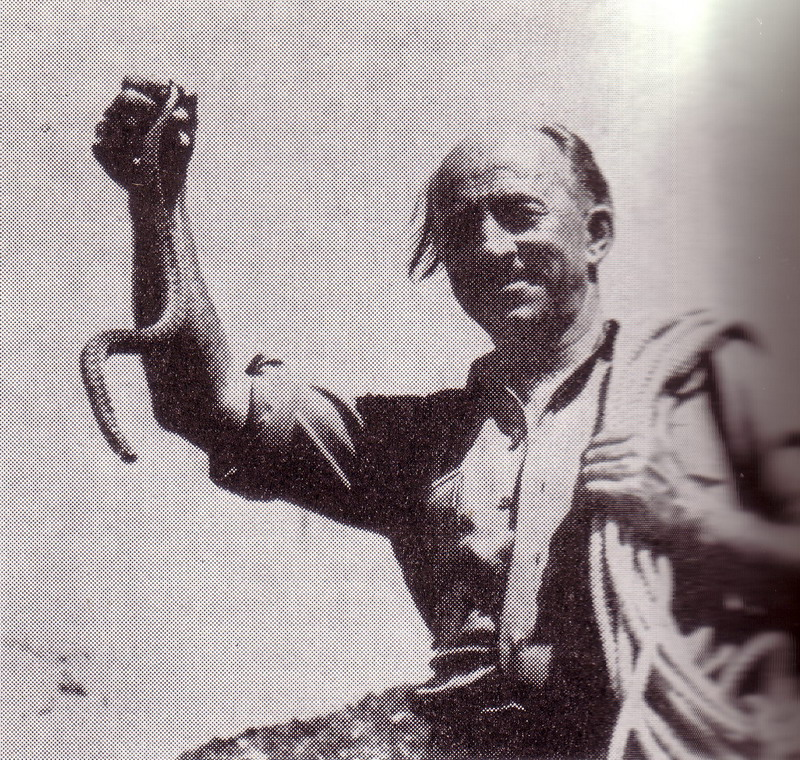
- Born: 6 October 1910; Ljubljana, Duchy of Carniola, Austria-Hungary
- Died: 21 February 1984 (aged 73); Ljubljana, SR Slovenia, SFR Yugoslavia
- Occupations: electrical engineer, inventor, and mountain safety expert

France Avčin (6 October 1910 – 21 February 1984) was a Slovenian electrical engineer, inventor, and mountain safety expert. He was the first post–World War II president of the Alpine Association of Slovenia. He was also a keen hunter and environmentalist.

== Life ==
Avčin was born in Ljubljana in 1910. He graduated with a degree in electrical engineering in 1935 from the University of Ljubljana where he also worked for a while before the Second World War. In 1943 he joined the Partisans and returned to the University after the war. He died in Ljubljana in 1984 and was buried in the Trenta Valley in the Julian Alps.

== Work ==
Avčin was an inventor, mountaineer, mountain rescuer and politician. He was an official of the International Climbing and Mountaineering Federation, acclaimed for his knowledge and work on the mountaineering equipment. He wrote numerous papers, articles and books both on electrical engineering and mountain safety. In 1960, he successfully proposed in Paris that Tesla is used as the SI unit of the strength of a magnetic field.

Avčin's inventions include the magnetic core with a changeable air gap, an improvement of the magnetic lens of the electron microscope, electronic long-distance speedometer, and a meter for measuring the path of ballistic missiles. He and his collaborator Anton Jeglič also invented an avalanche beacon transmitting at the frequency of 108 MHz, which emitted the sound of a woodpecker. In their honour, all avalanche beacons in Slovenia are named 'woodpeckers' (Slovene: žolna, plural: žolne).

== Recognitions ==
In 1964 he was awarded the Levstik Award for his book on his passion for the mountains Kjer tišina šepeta (Where Silence Whispers).
