= Vojtěch Veselý =

Czech figure skater

- Born: 19 April 1885; Kolín, Austria-Hungary
- Died: 7 December 1971 (aged 86); Kolín, Czechoslovakia

Figure skating career
- Country: Czechoslovakia

Vojtěch Veselý (19 April 1885 – 7 December 1971) was a Czech figure skater. He competed in the mixed pairs event at the 1928 Winter Olympics, along with wife Libuše Veselá.
