= Agnesa Wlachovská =

Agnesa Wlachovská-Búřilová
Personal information
- Other names: Married name: Agnesa Búřilová
- Born: 4 January 1943 (age 83) Rozsnyó, Hungary

Figure skating career
- Country: Czechoslovakia
- Skating club: Slovan Bratislava
- Began skating: 1952
- Retired: 1966

Agnesa Búřilová, née Wlachovská, (born 4 January 1943) is a former pair skater who competed for Czechoslovakia.

Agnesa Wlachovská began skating in 1952. After switching from singles to pairs, she had some bad falls — one resulted in a concussion that forced her to repeat a school year. With partner Peter Bartosiewicz, she finished ninth at the 1964 Winter Olympics. She became a coach after retiring from competition, working with 1984 Olympic bronze medalist Jozef Sabovčík.

Though born in Rožňava, Búřilová has lived most of her life in Bratislava. She has two sons, Peter Búřil and hockey player Vladimír Búřil (born in 1969). She is the great-aunt of Canadian ice dancer Andrew Poje.

== Results ==
(with Bartosiewicz)

International
Event	1963	1964	1965	1966
Winter Olympics		9th		
World Championships		10th		10th
European Championships	7th	8th	8th	13th
Winter Universiade				2nd
National
Czechoslovak Championships		1st	1st	1st
