= Panshin =

Panshin is a surname. Notable people with the surname include:

- Aleksandr Panshin (1863–1904), Russian speed skater and figure skater
- Alexei Panshin (1940–2022), American writer and science fiction critic
- Cory Panshin (born 1947), American writer and science fiction critic
- Mikhail Panshin (born 1983), Kazakhstani-Russian ice hockey player
