= 1993 European Figure Skating Championships =

Figure skating competition

1993 European Championships
- Type: ISU Championship
- Date: 12 – 17 January
- Season: 1992–93
- Location: Helsinki, Finland
- Venue: Helsinki Ice Hall

Champions
- Men's singles: (Ukraine) Dmitri Dmitrenko
- Ladies' singles: (France) Surya Bonaly
- Pairs: (Russia) Marina Eltsova / Andrei Bushkov
- Ice dance: (Russia) Maya Usova / Alexander Zhulin
- Previous: 1992 European Championships
- Next: 1994 European Championships

The 1993 European Figure Skating Championships was a senior-level international competition held in Helsinki, Finland from 12 to 17 January 1993. Elite skaters from European ISU member nations competed in the disciplines of men's singles, ladies' singles, pair skating, and ice dancing.

== Results ==
=== Men ===
Rank	Name	Nation	TFP	SP	FS
1	Dmitri Dmitrenko	Ukraine	3.5	1	3
2	Philippe Candeloro	France	4.0	6	1
3	Éric Millot	France	5.5	7	2
4	Konstantin Kostin	Latvia	6.5	5	4
5	Alexei Urmanov	Russia	8.0	4	6
6	Michael Tyllesen	Denmark	9.0	8	5
7	Oleg Tataurov	Russia	9.5	3	8
8	Oula Jääskeläinen	Finland	10.0	2	9
9	Steven Cousins	United Kingdom	11.5	9	7
10	Ronny Winkler	Germany	15.0	10	10
11	Henrik Walentin	Denmark	18.0	14	11
12	Roman Ekimov	Russia	19.0	12	13
13	Jaroslav Suchý	Czech Republic	19.5	15	12
14	John Martin	United Kingdom	19.5	11	14
15	Gilberto Viadana	Italy	24.5	19	15
16	Besarion Tsintsadze	Georgia	25.0	18	16
17	Robert Grzegorczyk	Poland	25.5	13	19
18	Daniel Peinado	Spain	26.0	16	18
19	Jan Erik Digernes	Norway	27.0	20	17
20	Szabolcs Vidrai	Hungary	29.5	17	21
21	Rastislav Vnučko	Slovakia	31.0	22	20
22	Alexander Murashko	Belarus	33.5	23	22
23	Tomislav Čižmešija	Croatia	33.5	21	23
WD	Cornel Gheorghe	Romania		24	
Did not advance to free skating
25	Marek Sząszor	Poland		25	
26	Ivan Dinev	Bulgaria		26	
27	Florian Tuma	Austria		27	
28	Nicolas Binz	Switzerland		28	
29	Raimo Reinsalu	Estonia		29	

=== Ladies ===
Rank	Name	Nation	TFP	SP	FS
1	Surya Bonaly	France	1.5	1	1
2	Oksana Baiul	Ukraine	3.5	3	2
3	Marina Kielmann	Germany	4.0	2	3
4	Tanja Szewczenko	Germany	6.0	4	4
5	Maria Butyrskaya	Russia	7.5	5	5
6	Krisztina Czakó	Hungary	9.0	6	6
7	Zuzanna Szwed	Poland	11.0	8	7
8	Alice Sue Claeys	Belgium	12.5	7	9
9	Marie-Pierre Leray	France	14.5	13	8
10	Simone Lang	Germany	14.5	9	10
11	Lenka Kulovaná	Czech Republic	18.0	12	12
12	Olga Markova	Russia	19.0	10	14
13	Alma Lepina	Latvia	20.5	11	15
14	Nathalie Krieg	Switzerland	21.0	20	11
15	Anna Rechnio	Poland	22.0	18	13
16	Irena Zemanová	Czech Republic	25.0	14	18
17	Viktoria Dimitrova	Bulgaria	25.5	19	16
18	Mojca Kopač	Slovenia	25.5	17	17
19	Charlene von Saher	United Kingdom	26.5	15	19
20	Christina Mauri	Italy	31.5	23	20
21	Kaisa Kella	Finland	33.0	24	21
22	Marion Krijgsman	Netherlands	33.0	22	22
23	Olga Vassiljeva	Estonia	35.5	25	23
WD	Laetitia Hubert	France			
WD	Anisette Torp-Lind	Denmark			

=== Pairs ===
Rank	Name	Nation	TFP	SP	FS
1	Marina Eltsova / Andrei Bushkov	Russia	2.0	2	1
2	Mandy Wötzel / Ingo Steuer	Germany	3.5	3	2
3	Evgenia Shishkova / Vadim Naumov	Russia	4.5	1	4
4	Radka Kovaříková / René Novotný	Czech Republic	5.5	5	3
5	Peggy Schwarz / Alexander König	Germany	7.0	4	5
6	Leslie Monod / Cédric Monod	Switzerland	9.0	6	6
7	Elena Tobiash / Sergei Smirnov	Russia	10.5	7	7
8	Elena Berezhnaya / Oleg Shliakhov	Latvia	12.0	8	8
9	Beata Zielińska / Mariusz Siudek	Poland	14.0	10	9
10	Svetlana Pristav / Viacheslav Tkachenko	Ukraine	14.5	9	10
11	Jekaterina Silnitzkaja / Marno Kreft	Germany	16.5	11	11
12	Jackie Soames / John Jenkins	United Kingdom	18.0	12	12
13	Victoria Pearce / Clive Shorten	United Kingdom	20.5	15	13
14	Sarah Abitbol / Stéphane Bernadis	France	20.5	13	14
15	Elena Grigoreva / Serghei Sheiko	Belarus	22.0	14	15

=== Ice dancing ===
Rank	Name	Nation	TFP	CD1	CD2	OD	FD
1	Maya Usova / Alexander Zhulin	Russia	2.0	1	1	1	1
2	Oksana Grishuk / Evgeni Platov	Russia	4.0	2	2	2	2
3	Susanna Rahkamo / Petri Kokko	Finland	6.0	3	3	3	3
4	Anjelika Krylova / Vladimir Fedorov	Russia	8.4	5	5	4	4
5	Stefania Calegari / Pasquale Camerlengo	Italy	10.6	4	4	5	6
6	Sophie Moniotte / Pascal Lavanchy	France	11.0	6	6	6	5
7	Irina Romanova / Igor Yaroshenko	Ukraine	14.0	7	7	7	7
8	Kateřina Mrázová / Martin Šimeček	Czech Republic	16.4	9	9	8	8
9	Tatiana Navka / Samuel Gezalian	Belarus	17.6	8	8	9	9
10	Jennifer Goolsbee / Hendryk Schamberger	Germany	20.0	10	10	10	10
11	Margarita Drobiazko / Povilas Vanagas	Lithuania	22.0	11	11	11	11
12	Marika Humphreys / Justin Lanning	United Kingdom	24.2	12	13	12	12
13	Irina Le Bed / Alexandre Piton	France	27.0	14	12	13	14
14	Agnieszka Domańska / Marcin Głowacki	Poland	28.8	17	17	15	13
15	Radmila Chroboková / Milan Brzý	Czech Republic	28.8	13	14	14	15
16	Kati Winkler / René Lohse	Germany	31.9	16	15	16	16
17	Barbara Minorini / Andrea Gilardi	Italy	33.4	15	16	17	17
18	Angelika Führing / Peter Wilczek	Austria	36.2	19	18	18	18
19	Diane Gerencser / Alexander Stanislavov	Switzerland	37.8	18	19	19	19
20	Enikő Berkes / Szilárd Tóth	Hungary	41.4	22	20	20	21
21	Noemi Vedres / Endre Szentirmai	Hungary	41.6	20	22	22	20
22	Albena Denkova / Hristo Nikolov	Bulgaria	43.0	21	21	21	22
23	Jelena Trocenko / Erik Samovich	Latvia	46.0	23	23	23	23
