= Hana Mašková =

Czech figure skater (1949–1972)

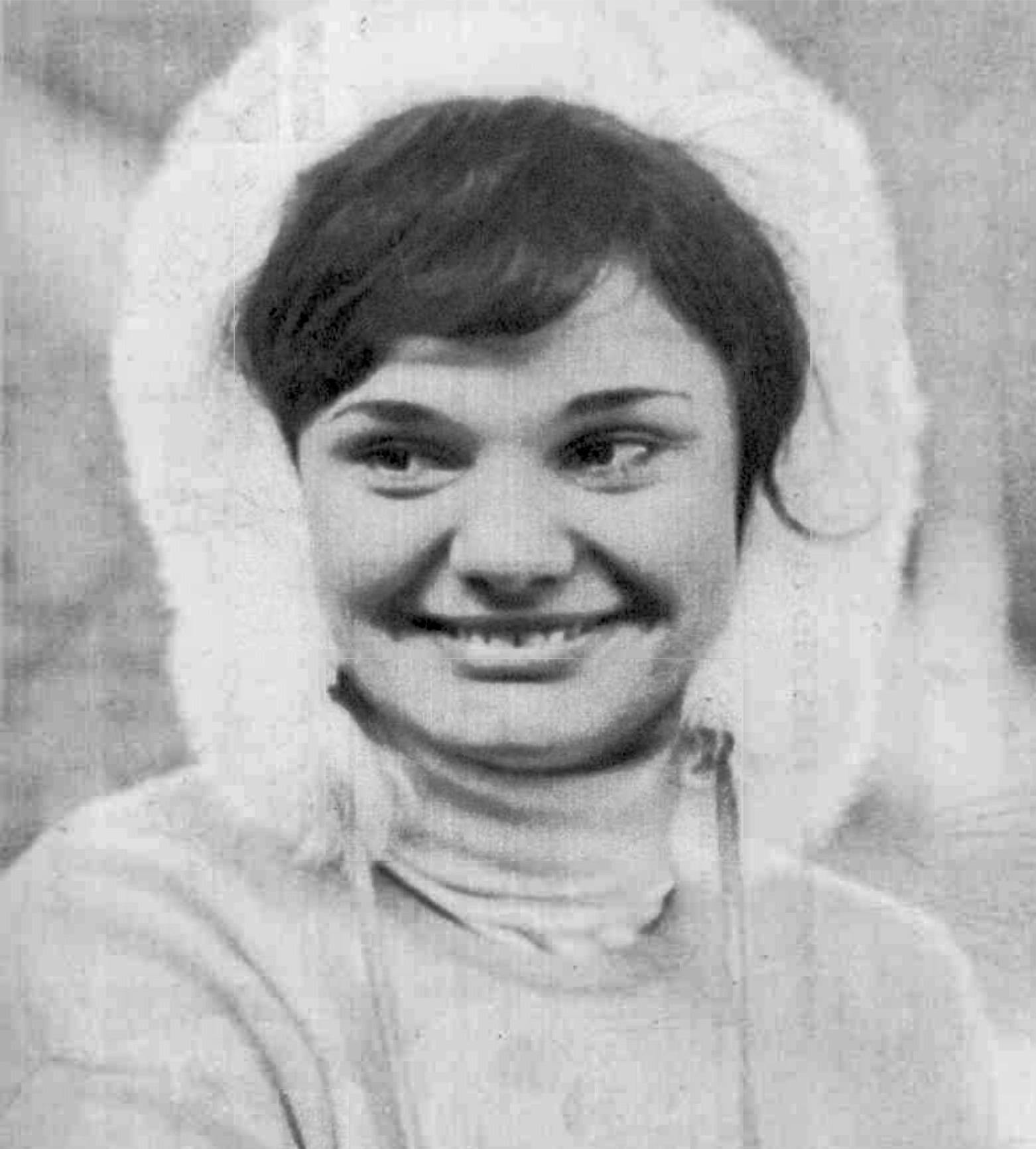
- Mašková in 1969

Personal information
- Born: 26 September 1949 Prague, Czechoslovakia
- Died: 31 March 1972 (aged 22) Vouvray, France

Figure skating career
- Country: Czechoslovakia
- Retired: 1969
Medal record
Representing Czechoslovakia
Figure skating: Ladies' singles
Olympic Games
Bronze medal – third place	1968 Grenoble	Ladies' singles
World Championships
Bronze medal – third place	1968 Geneva	Ladies' singles
Bronze medal – third place	1967 Vienna	Ladies' singles
European Championships
Silver medal – second place	1969 Garmisch-Partenkirchen	Ladies' singles
Gold medal – first place	1968 Västerås	Ladies' singles
Silver medal – second place	1967 Ljubljana	Ladies' singles

Hana Mašková (Czech pronunciation: [ˈɦana ˈmaʃkovaː]) (26 September 1949 – 31 March 1972) was a Czech figure skater who competed for Czechoslovakia. She was the 1968 Olympic bronze medalist, a two-time World bronze medalist (1967, 1968), and the 1968 European champion.

== Career ==
As a child, Mašková spent her days on the ice at the Štvanice Stadium. Karel Glogar, who had been instrumental in the early career of two-time World champion Ája Vrzáňová, identified her talent. Her next coach was Jaroslav Sadílek, followed by Míla Nováková in 1963.

Mašková's international career started at the 1963 European Championships in Budapest. The next year, she competed in the 1964 World Championships in Dortmund. As a fifteen-year-old, she represented Czechoslovakia at the 1964 Winter Olympics in Innsbruck and placed 15th.

In 1967, Mašková won the silver medal at the European Championships in Ljubljana, Yugoslavia, finishing second to Gabriele Seyfert from East Germany (GDR). One year later, Mašková won the gold medal in Västerås in Sweden. She competed at the 1968 Winter Olympics in Grenoble, winning the bronze medal behind Peggy Fleming of the United States, who had already won two World titles, and Seyfert. She is the only Czech woman to win an Olympic medal in figure skating.

Ája Vrzáňová invited her to join a professional show, but Mašková decided to compete one more year. She took the silver medal at the 1969 European Championships in Garmisch-Partenkirchen, West Germany, behind Gabriele Seyfert. In 1969, Mašková left competition and joined the Holiday on Ice tour.

== Death ==
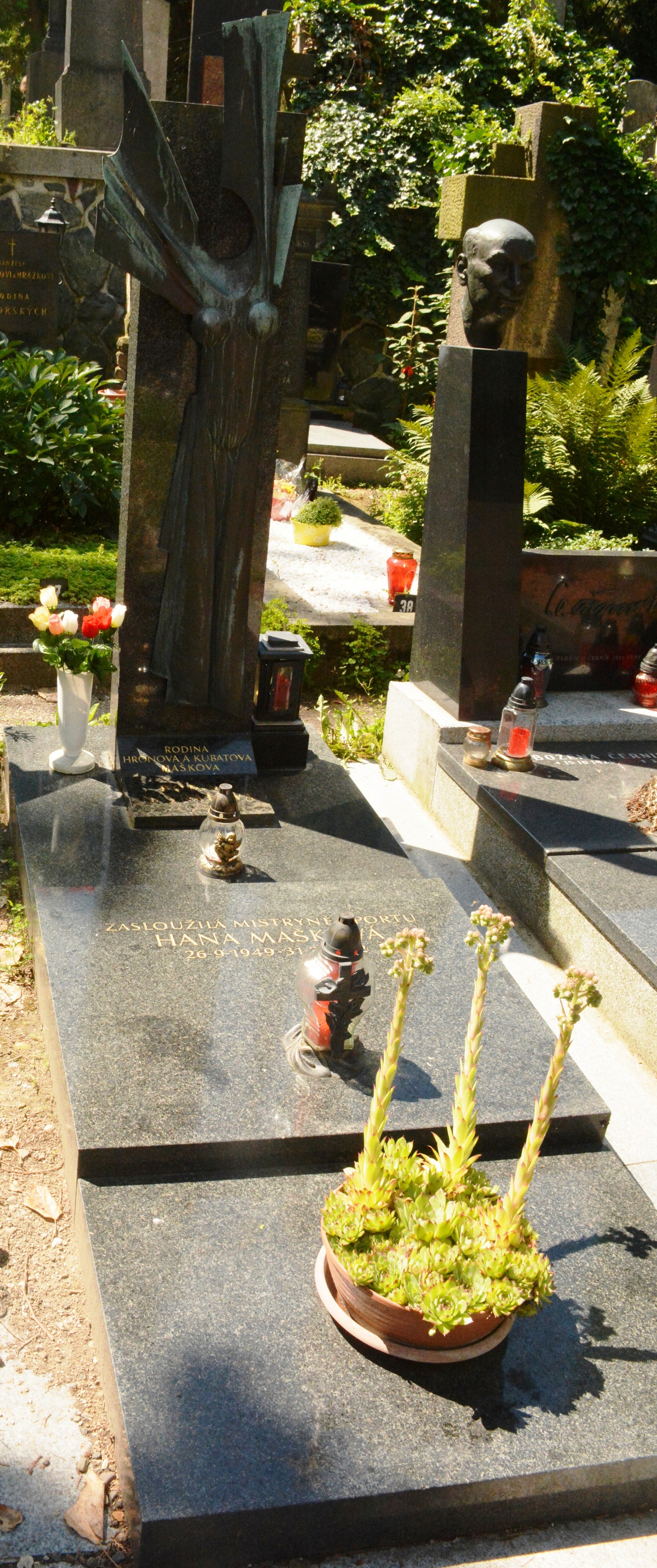
Tomb

On 31 March 1972, Mašková was killed in a car crash near the French town Vouvray. Her tomb is at the Vyšehrad cemetery in Prague, decorated by a winged female torso made by Jan Štursa.

== Competitive highlights ==
International
Event	62–63	63–64	64–65	65–66	66–67	67–68	68–69
Olympics		15th				3rd	
Worlds		16th	13th	6th	3rd	3rd	WD
Europeans	15th		7th	4th	2nd	1st	2nd
Prague Skate			4th	1st	1st	1st	
National
Czechoslovak			1st	1st	1st	1st	1st
WD = Withdrew
