= Margot Glockshuber =

German pair skater

Personal information
- Born: 26 June 1949 (age 77) Frankfurt am Main, Hessen, West Germany

Figure skating career
- Country: West Germany
Medal record
Representing West Germany
Pairs' Figure skating
Olympic Games
Bronze medal – third place	1968 Genoble	Pairs
World Championships
Silver medal – second place	1967 Vienna	Pairs
European Championships
Silver medal – second place	1967 Ljubljana	Pairs
Bronze medal – third place	1966 Bratislava	Pairs

Margot Glockshuber (born 26 June 1949) is a former West German pair skater. With partner Wolfgang Danne, she is the 1968 Winter Olympics bronze medalist. They are also the 1967 World and European silver medalists.

== Results ==
(with Wolfgang Danne)

International
Event	1964–65	1965–66	1966–67	1967–68
Winter Olympics				3rd
World Championships	11th	4th	2nd	WD
European Champ.	7th	3rd	2nd	4th
Prague Skate		1st	1st	
National
West German Champ.	2nd	3rd	1st	1st
WD = Withdrew
