= Prague Skate =

International figure skating competition

- Status: Defunct
- Genre: International competition
- Frequency: Annual
- Location: Prague
- Country: Czechoslovakia (1963–92); Czech Republic (1994–97)
- Years active: 1963–97
- Organizer: Czechoslovak Figure Skating Union (1963–92); Czech Figure Skating Association (1994–97)

Prague Skate (Czech: Pražská brusle) was an annual figure skating competition organized by the Czechoslovak Figure Skating Union (Czech: Československý krasobruslařský svaz). The first competition took place in 1963 in Prague, in what was then Czechoslovakia. After the dissolution of Czechoslovakia, the competition was relocated to Ostrava and rechristened Czech Skate (Czech: Česká brusle). It was also dedicated to the memory of Josef Dědič, who had won the 1947 Czechoslovak Figure Skating Championships and served as the last chair of the Czechoslovak Figure Skating Union before its dissolution in 1992.

Medals were awarded in men's singles, women's singles, pair skating, and ice dance, although each discipline may not have necessarily been held every year. Petr Barna of Czechoslovakia holds the record for winning the most Prague Skate titles in men's singles (with five), while Lenka Kulovaná and Hana Mašková, both of Czechslovakia, are tied for winning the most titles in women's singles (with three each). Three teams are tied for winning the most titles in pair skating (with two each): Margot Glockshuber and Wolfgang Danne of West Germany, Radka Kovaříková and René Novotný of the Czech Republic, and Mandy Wötzel and Axel Rauschenbach of East Germany. Four teams are tied for winning the most titles in ice dance (with two each), all from Czechoslovakia: Jitka Babická and Jaromír Holan, Kateřina Mrázková and Martin Šimeček, Liliana Řeháková and Stanislav Drastich, and Eva Romanová and Pavel Roman.

In 1997, the Junior Grand Prix of Figure Skating – then called the Junior Series – was established by the International Skating Union as a series of international skating competitions exclusively for junior-level skaters. The Czech Skate has periodically been held as an installment of this series beginning in 1999.

== Medalists ==
=== Men's singles ===
Men's event medalists
Year	Location	Gold	Silver	Bronze	Ref.
1963	Prague	(Czechoslovakia) Karol Divín	(Austria) Heinrich Podhajsky	(Soviet Union) Valery Meshkov	
1964	Prague	(Czechoslovakia) Ondrej Nepela	(East Germany) Günter Zöller	(Soviet Union) Vladimir Kurenbin	
1965	Prague	(Italy) Giordano Abbondati	(Czechoslovakia) Ondrej Nepela	(Soviet Union) Valery Meshkov	
1966	Prague	(Czechoslovakia) Ondrej Nepela	(Germany) Peter Krick	(Soviet Union) Sergei Chetverukhin	
1967	Prague	(Czechoslovakia) Ondrej Nepela	(Soviet Union) Sergei Chetverukhin	(Czechoslovakia) Marian Filc	
1968–69	Prague	No competitions held			
1970	Prague	(Germany) Klaus Grimmelt	(Soviet Union) Vladimir Kovalev	(Italy) Stefano Bargauan	
1971	Prague	(Italy) Stefano Bargauan	(Czechoslovakia) Zdeněk Pazdírek	(Switzerland) Daniel Höner	
1972	Prague	(United States) Gordon McKellen	(Czechoslovakia) Zdeněk Pazdírek	(France) Jacques Mrozek	
1973	Prague	(Czechoslovakia) František Pechar	(United States) David Santee	(Canada) Robert Rubens	
1974	Prague	(United States) Terry Kubicka	(Czechoslovakia) František Pechar	(Soviet Union) Konstantin Kokora	
1975	Prague	(United States) Charlie Tickner	(Soviet Union) Konstantin Kokora	(Czechoslovakia) Zdeněk Pazdírek	
1976	Prague	(United States) Scott Cramer	(Czechoslovakia) František Pechar	(France) Jean-Christophe Simond	
1977	Prague	(United States) John Carlow	(Czechoslovakia) Miroslav Šoška	(Soviet Union) Georgi Starkov	
1978	Prague	(France) Jean-Christophe Simond	(Canada) Vern Taylor	(United States) Robert Wagenhoffer	
1979	Prague	(Canada) Gordon Forbes	(United States) Allen Schramm	(Czechoslovakia) Jozef Sabovčík	
1980	Prague	(Czechoslovakia) Jozef Sabovčík	(Canada) Daniel Béland	(Poland) Grzegorz Głowania	
1981	Prague	(Czechoslovakia) Jozef Sabovčík	(Canada) Neil Paterson	(Soviet Union) Gurgen Vardanjan	
1982	Prague	(Czechoslovakia) Jozef Sabovčík	(Canada) André Bourgeois	(Japan) Makoto Kano	
1983	Prague	(Japan) Takashi Mura	(United States) James Santee	(Canada) Campbell Sinclair	
1984	Prague	(Czechoslovakia) Petr Barna	(West Germany) Richard Zander	(Soviet Union) Gurgen Vardanjan	
1985	Prague	(Czechoslovakia) Petr Barna	(East Germany) Ralf Lewandowski	(France) Philippe Roncoli	
1986	Prague	(Czechoslovakia) Petr Barna	(Denmark) Henrik Walentin	(West Germany) Daniel Weiss	
1987	Prague	(Czechoslovakia) Petr Barna	(West Germany) Heiko Fischer	(Soviet Union) Dmitri Gromov	
1988	Prague	(Czechoslovakia) Petr Barna	(France) Philippe Candeloro	(Romania) Zsolt Kerekes	
1989	Prague	(France) Nicolas Pétorin	(Soviet Union) Gleb Bokiy	(East Germany) Mirko Eichhorn	
1990	Prague	No men's competitors			
1992	Prague	(Japan) Masakazu Kagiyama	(United States) Rudy Galindo	(Canada) Marcus Christensen	
1993	No competition held				
1994	Ostrava	(Ukraine) Evgeni Pliuta	(United Kingdom) Clive Shorten	(Russia) Alexei Yagudin	
1995	Ostrava	(Russia) Roman Ekimov	(Ukraine) Yevgeny Martynov	(France) Laurent Tobel	
1996	Ostrava	No competition held			
1997	Ostrava	(Canada) Stéphane Yvars	(Poland) Robert Grzegorczyk	(Ukraine) Yevgeny Martynov	
For results after 1997, see ISU Junior Grand Prix in the Czech Republic

=== Women's singles ===
Women's event medalists
Year	Location	Gold	Silver	Bronze	Ref.
1963	Prague	(Czechoslovakia) Hana Mašková	(East Germany) Gabriele Seyfert	(Czechoslovakia) Alena Augustová	
1964	Prague	(France) Nicole Hassler	(East Germany) Gabriele Seyfert	(Czechoslovakia) Jana Mrázková	
1965	Prague	(Czechoslovakia) Hana Mašková	(Hungary) Zsuzsa Almássy	(Germany) Uschi Keszler	
1966	Prague	(Hungary) Zsuzsa Almassy	(Czechoslovakia) Hana Mašková	(Austria) Elisabeth Nestler	
1967	Prague	(Czechoslovakia) Hana Mašková	(East Germany) Beate Richter	(Austria) Elisabeth Mikula	
1968–69	Prague	No competitions held			
1970	Prague	(Czechoslovakia) Ľudmila Bezáková	(Germany) Ilka Spormann	(Canada) Mary McCaffrey	
1971	Prague	(Czechoslovakia) Hana Knapová	(East Germany) Anett Pötzsch	(Switzerland) Karin Iten	
1972	Prague	(United States) Dorothy Hamill	(West Germany) Gerti Schanderl	(Canada) Daria Prychun	
1973	Prague	(Canada) Lynn Nightingale	(United States) Wendy Burge	(Netherlands) Dianne de Leeuw	
1974	Prague	(United States) Kath Malmberg	(Czechoslovakia) Hana Knapová	(East Germany) Steffi Knoll	
1975	Prague	(United States) Priscilla Hill	(Italy) Susanna Driano	(Poland) Grażyna Dudek	
1976	Prague	(Austria) Claudia Kristofics-Binder	(United States) Lisa-Marie Allen	(Switzerland) Anita Siegfried	
1977	Prague	(United States) Kathy Gelecinsky	(East Germany) Marion Weber	(Canada) Deborah Albright	
1978	Prague	(United States) Jill Sawyer	(West Germany) Karin Riediger	(Czechoslovakia) Renata Baierová	
1979	Prague	(United States) Elaine Zayak	(Czechoslovakia) Renata Baierová	(Switzerland) Myriam Oberwiler	
1980	Prague	(East Germany) Carola Paul	(Soviet Union) Anna Kondrashova	(Japan) Megumi Yanagihara	
1981	Prague	(Canada) Kerry Smith	(Japan) Juri Ozawa	(Soviet Union) Alla Fomicheva	
1982	Prague	(France) Agnès Gosselin	(Soviet Union) Natalia Lebedeva	(East Germany) Karin Hendschke	
1983	Prague	(Japan) Midori Ito	(Japan) Sachie Yuki	(East Germany) Constanze Gensel	
1984	Prague	(West Germany) Cornelia Renner	(United States) Leslie Sikes	(East Germany) Simone Koch	
1985	Prague	(East Germany) Inga Gauter	(Japan) Sachie Yuki	(Japan) Izumi Oatani	
1986	Prague	(West Germany) Susanne Becher	(Czechoslovakia) Jana Přibylová	(Soviet Union) Inna Krundysheva	
1987	Prague	(Sweden) Lotta Falkenbäck	(Austria) Yvonne Pokorny	(United States) Julie Wasserman	
1988	Prague	(East Germany) Simone Lang	(Italy) Sabine Contini	(Switzerland) Michèle Claret	
1989	Prague	(United States) Tisha Walker	(East Germany) Simone Koch	(Czechoslovakia) Marcela Kochollová	
1990	Prague	(Czechoslovakia) Lenka Kulovaná	(Germany) Simone Lang	(Japan) Mari Asanuma	
1992	Prague	(Japan) Yuka Sato	(France) Surya Bonaly	(Hungary) Krisztina Czakó	
1993	No competition held				
1994	Ostrava	(Czech Republic) Lenka Kulovaná	(Czech Republic) Kateřina Beránková	(Ukraine) Elena Liashenko	
1995	Ostrava	(Czech Republic) Lenka Kulovaná	(Russia) Daria Timoshenko	(Canada) Netty Kim	
1996	Ostrava	No competition held			
1997	Ostrava	(Russia) Ekaterina Siniapkina	(Canada) Annie Bellemare	(Poland) Marta Głuchowska	
For results after 1997, see ISU Junior Grand Prix in the Czech Republic

=== Pairs ===
Pairs event medalists
Year	Location	Gold	Silver	Bronze	Ref.
1963	Prague	(Soviet Union); Tatyana Zhuk; Alexander Gavrilov	(Czechoslovakia); Milada Kubíková; Jaroslav Votruba	No other competitors	
1964	Prague	(Germany); Sonja Pferzdorf; Günter Matzdorf	(Czechoslovakia); Agnesa Wlachovská; Peter Bartosiewicz	(Soviet Union); Tatiana Tarasova; Georgi Proskurin	
1965	Prague	(Germany); Margot Glockshuber; Wolfgang Danne	(Switzerland); Monique Mathys; Yves Aellig	(Czechoslovakia); Vera Stehliková; Karel Fajfr	
1966	Prague	(Germany); Margot Glockshuber; Wolfgang Danne	(Germany); Gudrun Hauss; Walter Häfner	(East Germany); Heidemarie Steiner; Heinz-Ulrich Walther	
1967	Prague	(Soviet Union); Tatiana Sharanova; Anatoli Evdokimov	(Germany); Marianne Streifler; Herbert Wiesinger	(Poland); Janina Poremska; Piotr Szczypa	
1968–77	Prague	No pairs competitions			
1978	Prague	(United States); Vicky Heasley; Robert Wagenhoffer	(Czechoslovakia); Ingrid Spieglová; Alan Spiegl	(Soviet Union); Nelli Chervotkina; Viktor Teslia	
1979	Prague	(Soviet Union); Nelli Chervotkina; Viktor Teslia	(Czechoslovakia); Ingrid Spieglová; Alan Spiegl	(East Germany); Birgit Lorenz; Knut Schubert	
1980	Prague	(East Germany); Birgit Lorenz; Knut Schubert	(Canada); Becky Gough; Mark Rowsom	(Czechoslovakia); Ingrid Ženatá; René Novotný	
1981	Prague	(Canada); Melinda Kunhegyi; Lyndon Johnston	(Soviet Union); Inna Volyanskaya; Valery Spiridonov	(United States); Lynne Freeman; Jay Freeman	
1982	Prague	(East Germany); Babette Preußler; Torsten Ohlow	(Soviet Union); Elena Bechke; Valery Kornienko	(Czechoslovakia); Jana Havlová; René Novotný	
1983	Prague	(Soviet Union); Inna Bekker; Serguei Likhanski	(East Germany); Peggy Seidel; Ralf Seifert	(Japan); Toshimi Ito; Takashi Mura	
1984	Prague	(Soviet Union); Yulia Bystrova; Alexander Tarasov	(Czechoslovakia); Dagmar Kovářová; Jozef Komár	(United States); Maria Lako; Michael Blicharski	
1985	Prague	(United States); Lori Blasko; Todd Sand	(Soviet Union); Svetlana Frantsuzova; Oleg Gorshkov	(Canada); Laurene Collin; David Howe	
1986	Prague	(East Germany); Peggy Schwarz; Alexander König	(Soviet Union); Elena Bechke; Valery Kornienko	(Soviet Union); Lyudmila Koblova; Andrei Kalitin	
1987	Prague	(East Germany); Mandy Wötzel; Axel Rauschenbach	(Soviet Union); Natalia Mishkutionok; Artur Dmitriev	(Canada); Isabelle Brasseur; Lloyd Eisler	
1988	Prague	(East Germany); Mandy Wötzel; Axel Rauschenbach	(Soviet Union); Karina Guchmazova; Sergei Petrovski	(Australia); Danielle Carr; Stephen Carr	
1989	Prague	(Czechoslovakia); Radka Kovaříková; René Novotný	(East Germany); Ines Müller; Ingo Steuer	(Soviet Union); Karina Guchmazova; Sergei Petrovski	
1990	Prague	(United States); Karen Courtland; Jason Dungjen	(Canada); Kristy Sargeant; Colin Epp	(Soviet Union); Ludmila Kaleniuk; Gennadii Markushin	
1992	Prague	(United States); Jenni Meno; Todd Sand	(Latvia); Elena Berezhnaya; Oļegs Šļahovs	(Canada); Tiina Muur; Cory Watson	
1993	No competition held				
1994	Ostrava	(Czech Republic); Radka Kovaříková; René Novotný	(Russia); Oksana Kazakova; Dmitri Sukhanov	(Russia); Elena Tobiash; Sergei Smirnov	
1995	Ostrava	(Russia); Olga Semkina; Andrei Chuvilaev	(Poland); Dorota Zagórska; Mariusz Siudek	(Germany); Silvia Dimitrov; Rico Rex	
1996	Ostrava	No competition held			
1997	Ostrava	(Canada); Valerie Saurette; Jean-Sébastien Fecteau	(Canada); Jodeyne Higgins; Sean Rice	(United Kingdom); Marsha Poluliaschenko; Andrew Seabrook	
For results after 1997, see ISU Junior Grand Prix in the Czech Republic

=== Ice dance ===
Ice dance event medalists
Year	Location	Gold	Silver	Bronze	Ref.
1963	Prague	(Czechoslovakia); Eva Romanová; Pavel Roman	(Czechoslovakia); Jitka Babická; Jaromír Holan	(United Kingdom); Anne Cross; Francis Leonard Williams	
1964	Prague	(Czechoslovakia); Eva Romanová; Pavel Roman	(Czechoslovakia); Jitka Babická; Jaromír Holan	(West Germany); Gabriele Rauch; Rudi Matysik	
1965	Prague	(Czechoslovakia); Jitka Babická; Jaromír Holan	(West Germany); Gabriele Matysik; Rudi Matysik	(United Kingdom); Ms. Dean; Mr. Webster	
1966	Prague	(Czechoslovakia); Jitka Babická; Jaromír Holan	(West Germany); Gabriele Matysik; Rudi Matysik	(Soviet Union); Irina Grishkova; Viktor Ryzhkin	
1967	Prague	(Soviet Union); Irina Grishkova; Viktor Ryzhkin	(Czechoslovakia); Dana Novotná; Jaromír Holan	(East Germany); Annerose Baier; Eberhard Rüger	
1968–77	Prague	No ice dance competitions			
1978	Prague	(Czechoslovakia); Liliana Řeháková; Stanislav Drastich	(Soviet Union); Natalia Bestemianova; Andrei Bukin	(United States); Karen Mankowich; Douglas Mankowich	
1979	Prague	(Czechoslovakia); Liliana Řeháková; Stanislav Drastich	(United States); Judy Blumberg; Michael Seibert	(Czechoslovakia); Anna Pisánská; Jiří Musil	
1980	Prague	(Soviet Union); Elena Garanina; Igor Zavozin	(Czechoslovakia); Jana Beránková; Jan Barták	(Canada); Gina Aucoin; Hans Peter Ponikau	
1981	Prague	(Czechoslovakia); Jana Beránková; Jan Barták	(United States); Terri Slater; Rick Berg	(Soviet Union); Yulia Romanova; Yuri Gaichenkov	
1982	Prague	No ice dance competition			
1983	Prague	(Czechoslovakia); Jindra Holá; Karol Foltán	(Soviet Union); Maya Usova; Alexander Zhulin	(United States); Lois Luciani; Russ Witherby	
1984	Prague	(Japan); Noriko Sato; Tadayuki Takahashi	(Austria); Kathrin Beck; Christoff Beck	(United States); Margaret Bodo; Rick Berg	
1985	Prague	No ice dance competitions			
1986	Prague	No ice dance competitions			
1987	Prague	(United States); Renée Roca; James Yorke	(Italy); Michela Malingambi; Andrea Gilardi	(Czechoslovakia); Viera Řeháková; Ivan Havránek	
1988	Prague	(Czechoslovakia); Andrea Juklová; Martin Šimeček	(Italy); Stefania Calegari; Pasquale Camerlengo	(Finland); Susanna Rahkamo; Petri Kokko	
1989	Prague	(Czechoslovakia); Monika Mandiková; Oliver Pekar	(Czechoslovakia); Ivana Střondalová; Milan Brzý	(Soviet Union); Maria Orlova; Alexei Kiliakov	
1990	Prague	(Canada); Dara Bailey; Rock Lemay	(Czechoslovakia); Monika Mandiková; Oliver Pekar	(Soviet Union); Elena Grushina; Ruslan Honcharov	
1992	Prague	(Russia); Elena Kustarova; Oleg Ovsyannikov	(Czech Republic); Kateřina Mrázová; Martin Šimeček	(United States); Jennifer Nocito; Michael Verlich	
1993	No competition held				
1994	Ostrava	(Czech Republic); Kateřina Mrázová; Martin Šimeček	(Ukraine); Svitlana Chernikova; Oleksandr Sosnenko	(Germany); Yvonne Schulz; Sven Authorsen	
1995	Ostrava	(Czech Republic); Kateřina Mrázová; Martin Šimeček	(Russia); Olga Sharutenko; Dmitri Naumkin	(Poland); Iwona Filipowicz; Michał Szumski	
1996	Ostrava	No competition held			
1997	Ostrava	(Canada); Marie-France Dubreuil; Patrice Lauzon	(France); Magali Sauri; Olivier Chapuis	(Italy); Francesca Fermi; Andrei Baldi	
For results after 1997, see ISU Junior Grand Prix in the Czech Republic

== Records ==
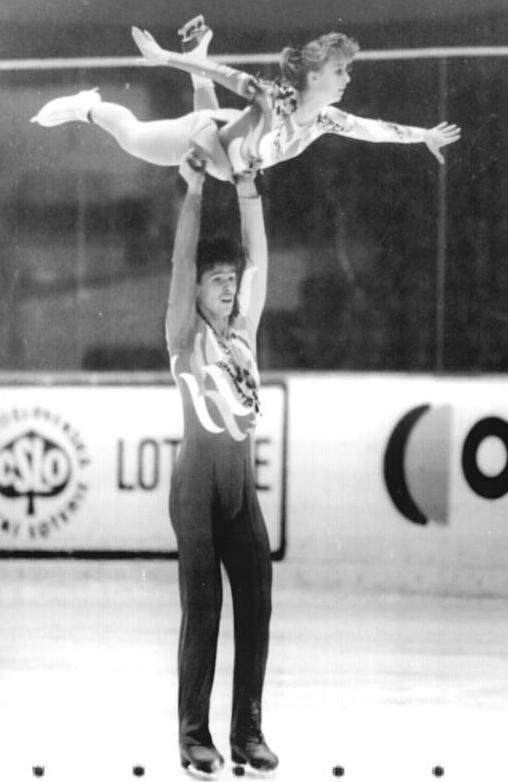
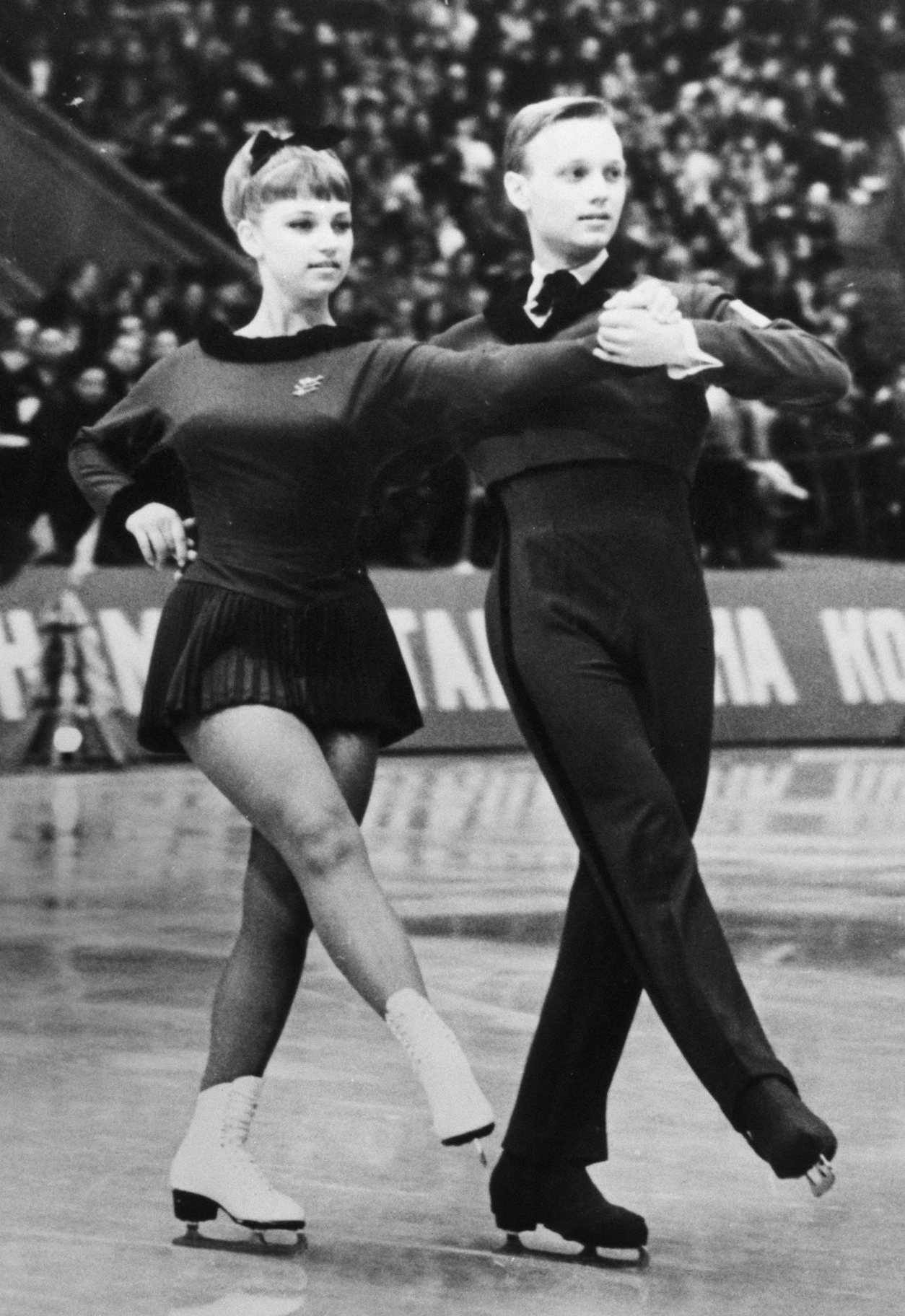
Mandy Wötzel and Axel Rauschenbach of East Germany won two Prague Skate titles in pair skating, while Eva Romanová and Pavel Roman of Czechoslovakia won two Prague Skate titles in ice dance.

Records
Discipline	Most titles			
Discipline	Skater(s)	No.	Years	Ref.
Men's singles	(Czechoslovakia); Petr Barna	5	1984–88	
Women's singles	(Czechoslovakia); Lenka Kulovaná	3	1990; 1994–95	
Women's singles	(Czechoslovakia); Hana Mašková	3	1963; 1965; 1967	
Pairs	(Germany); Margot Glockshuber; Wolfgang Danne	2	1965–66	
Pairs	(Czech Republic); Radka Kovaříková; René Novotný; (Note: Radka Kovaříková and René Novotný won the 1989 Prague Skate while representing Czechoslovakia, and the 1994 Czech Skate while representing the Czech Republic.)	2	1989; 1994	
Pairs	(East Germany); Mandy Wötzel; Axel Rauschenbach	2	1987–88	
Ice dance	(Czechoslovakia); Jitka Babická; Jaromír Holan	2	1965–66	
Ice dance	(Czech Republic); Kateřina Mrázová; Martin Šimeček	2	1994–95	
Ice dance	(Czechoslovakia); Liliana Řeháková; Stanislav Drastich	2	1978–79	
Ice dance	(Czechoslovakia); Eva Romanová; Pavel Roman	2	1963–64	
