= Tigran Vardanjan =

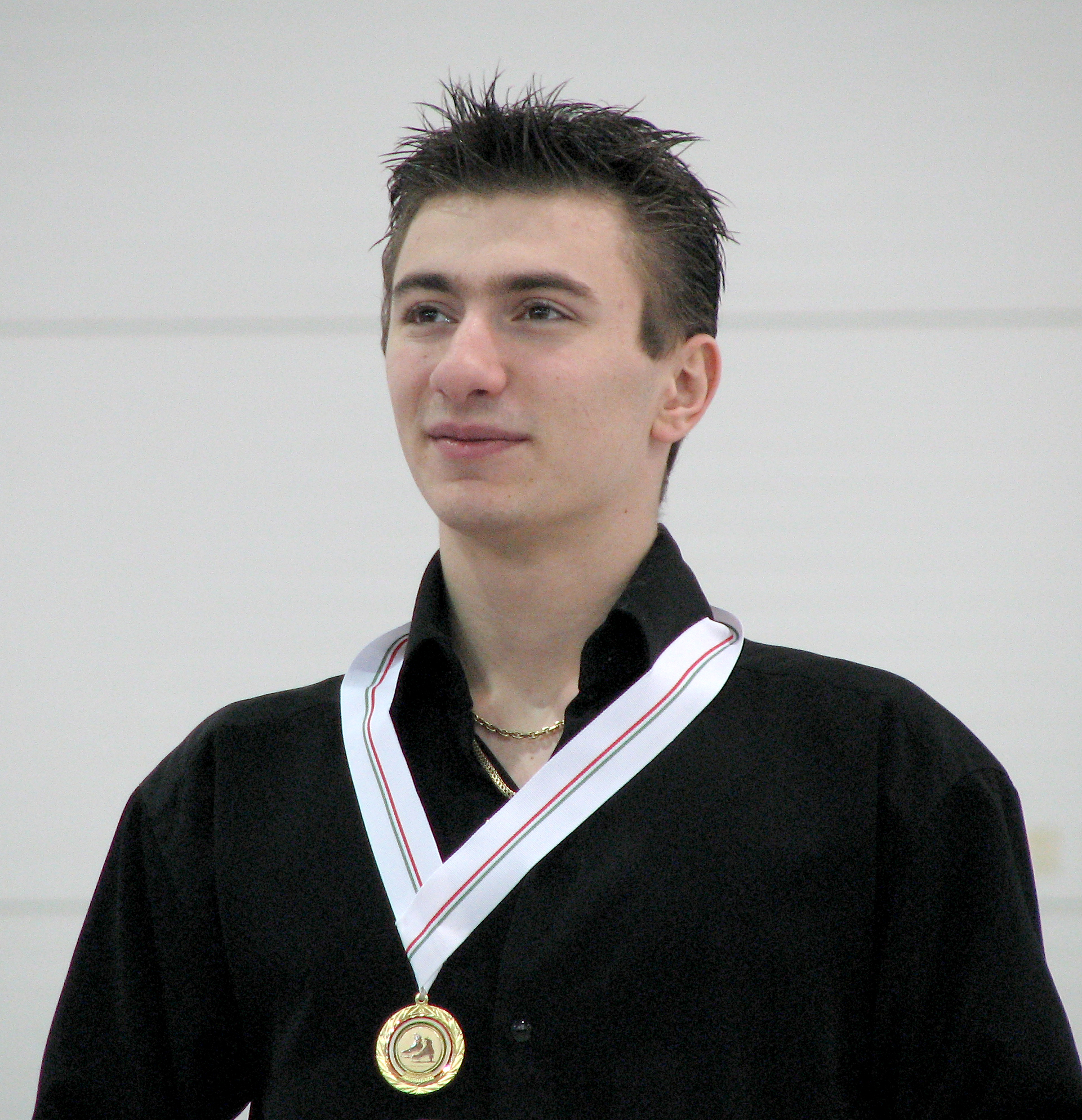
- Tigran Vardanjan at the 2007-2008 Hungarian Championship

Personal information
- Born: 26 March 1989 (age 37) Moscow, Russian SFSR, Soviet Union
- Home town: Budapest, Hungary
- Height: 1.83 m (6 ft 0 in)

Figure skating career
- Country: Hungary
- Coach: Ipakjan Jeranjak; Gurgen Vardanjan
- Skating club: Delta Fitness SE
- Retired: 2011

Tigran Vardanjan (born 26 March 1989) is a former competitive figure skater who represented Hungary. He is the 2007–2009 Hungarian national champion. Coached by his parents, Armenian-born Gurgen Vardanjan and Jeranjak Ipakjan, he trained in Budapest and occasionally in Nottingham, England.

He is a student at the Budapest College of Communication and Business.

== Programs ==
Season	Short program	Free skating
2010–2011	Tango	Story of a Mafioso
2008–2010	Take Five by Dave Brubeck	Passion by Peter Gabriel; Armenian Rhapsody by Ara Gevorgyan
2007–2008	Scent of a Woman soundtrack by Thomas Newman; Libertango by Astor Piazzolla performed by Bond	Passion by Peter Gabriel; Armenian Rhapsody by Ara Gevorgyan
2006–2007	Quidam from Cirque du Soleil	The Godfather soundtrack by Nino Rota

== Competitive highlights ==
Event	2004–05	2005–06	2006–07	2007–08	2008–09	2009–10	2010–11
World Championships				44th	31st	41st	34th
European Championships				34th	35th		30th
World Junior Championships		17th QR	30th				
Hungarian Championships		3rd	1st	1st	1st	2nd	1st
Crystal Skate of Romania						6th	
Golden Spin of Zagreb			19th	25th	18th	12th	9th
Nebelhorn Trophy						22nd	
Karl Schäfer Memorial					17th		
Ondrej Nepela Memorial					21st		
Icechallange Graz						10th	
Junior Grand Prix, Austria				24th			
Junior Grand Prix, Hungary	22nd		20th				
Junior Grand Prix, Germany	27th						

- QR = Qualifying round
