= Wolfgang Danne =

West German pair skater (1941–2019)

Personal information
- Born: 9 December 1941 Hildesheim, Lower Saxony, Germany
- Died: 16 June 2019 (aged 77)

Figure skating career
- Country: West Germany
- Partner: Margot Glockshuber; Sigrid Riechmann
Medal record
Representing West Germany
Figure skating: Pairs
Olympic Games
Bronze medal – third place	1968 Grenoble	Pairs
World Championships
Silver medal – second place	1967 Vienna	Pairs
European Championships
Silver medal – second place	1967 Ljubljana	Pairs
Bronze medal – third place	1966 Bratislava	Pairs

Olympic medal record

Figure skating
Bronze medal – third place	1968 Grenoble	Pairs

Wolfgang Danne (9 December 1941 – 16 June 2019) was a West German pair skater. He was born in Hildesheim. With partner Margot Glockshuber, he became the 1968 Olympic bronze medalist. They were also the 1967 World and 1967 European silver medalists.

== Results ==
=== With Margot Glockshuber ===
International
Event	1964–65	1965–66	1966–67	1967–68
Winter Olympics				3rd
World Championships	11th	4th	2nd	WD
European Champ.	7th	3rd	2nd	4th
Prague Skate		1st	1st	
National
West German Champ.	2nd	3rd	1st	1st
WD = Withdrew

=== With Sigrid Riechmann ===
International
Event	1962–63	1963–64
World Championships		9th
European Championships	11th	6th
National
West German Champ.	3rd	3rd
