= Elena Tobiash =

Russian former pair skater

Personal information
- Born: 1976 (age 49–50)

Figure skating career
- Country: Russia

Elena Tobiash (Russian: Елена Степановна Тобяш, b. 1976) is a Russian former pair skater. With partner Sergei Smirnov, she placed seventh at the 1993 European Championships in Helsinki. She works as a coach in Iowa.

== Competitive highlights ==
(with Smirnov)

International
Event	1992–93	1993–94	1994–95
European Championships	7th		
Nations Cup			5th
NHK Trophy		9th	
Prague Skate			3rd
National
Russian Championships	2nd		5th
