= Leslie Monod =

Swiss pair skater

Personal information
- Other names: Leslie Monod Mounoud
- Born: c. 1976 (age 49–50)

Figure skating career
- Country: Switzerland
- Retired: February 1994

Leslie Monod (born c. 1976) is a Swiss former pair skater. With Cédric Monod, she is a three-time Swiss national champion (1992–94) and placed as high as sixth at the European Championships (1993).

== Personal life ==
Born c. 1976, Leslie Monod is the younger sister of Cédric Monod. She married Christophe Mounoud, with whom she has two children, Taotim and Natoé. She is a pediatrician.

== Skating career ==
Leslie Monod competed in pairs with her brother, Cédric. They represented Switzerland internationally and CP Lausanne in domestic events. Their coaches included Heidemarie Steiner and Jacques Mrozek.

The Monod siblings won the first of their three Swiss national titles in 1992. They finished 8th at the 1992 European Championships in Lausanne and 12th at the 1992 World Championships in Oakland, California. The following season, they placed sixth at the 1993 European Championships in Helsinki and 9th at the 1993 World Championships in Prague. Their Worlds result allowed Switzerland to send two pair teams to the 1994 Winter Olympics.

In the 1993–94 season, the Monod siblings won their third national title but finished just out of the top ten, in 11th place, at the 1994 European Championships in Copenhagen. Following the Copenhagen result, the Swiss Olympic Association elected not to send them to the Olympics. The pair announced their competitive retirement on 3 February 1994.

== Programs ==
(with Cédric Monod)

Season	Short program	Free skating
1993–1994	In the Mood by Glenn Miller	
1992–1993	Rigoletto by Giuseppe Verdi	
1991–1992	Limelight by Charlie Chaplin	

== Competitive highlights ==
(with Cédric Monod)

International
Event	1990–91	1991–92	1992–93	1993–94
World Championships		12th	9th	
European Championships		8th	6th	11th
Skate America				9th
International: Junior
World Junior Champ.	15th			
National
Swiss Championships		1st	1st	1st
