= Gurgen Vardanjan =

Armenian figure skater

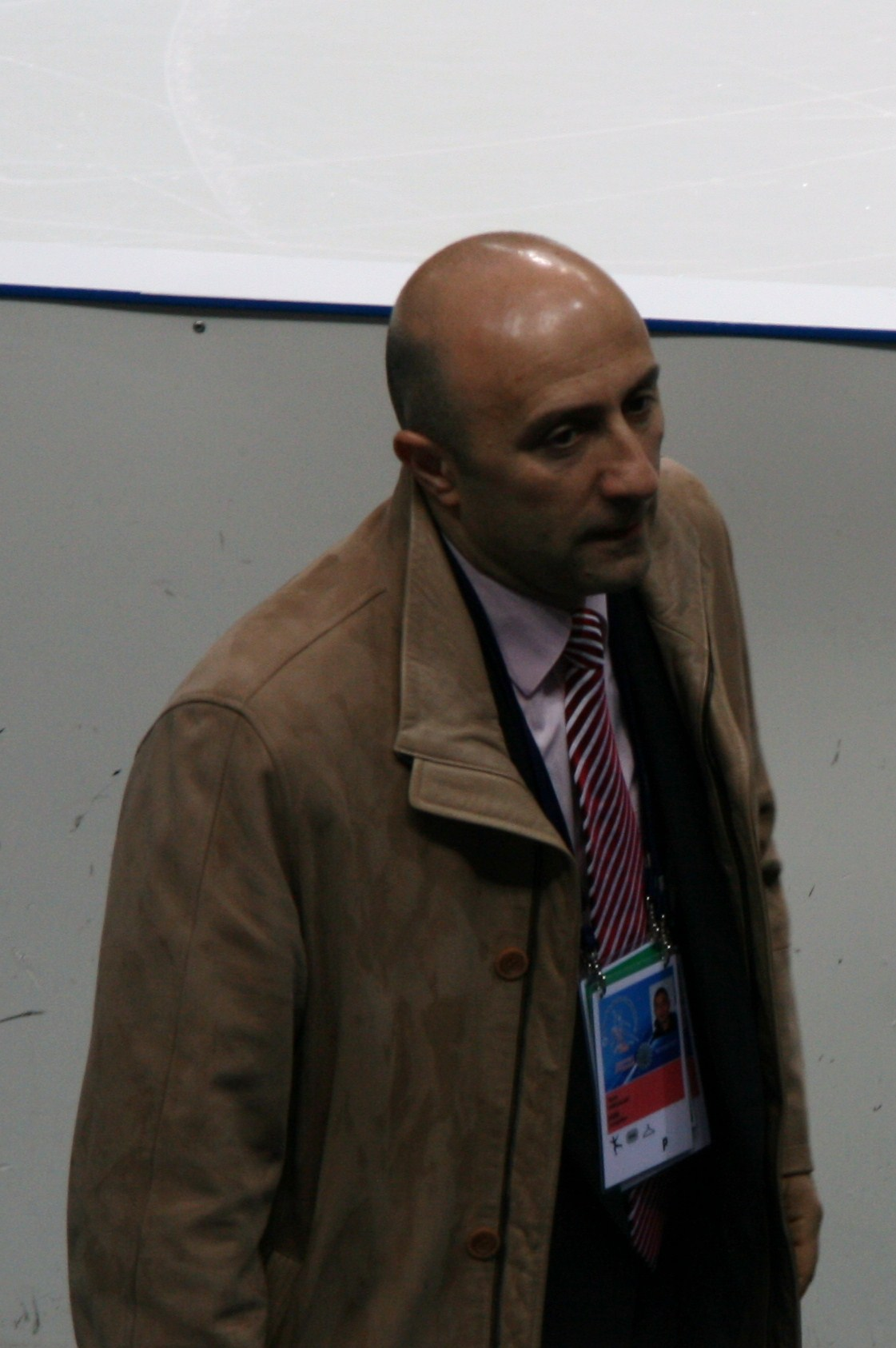
- Gurgen Vardanyan at the 2011 World Figure Skating Championships

Personal information
- Born: 18 October 1963 (age 62) Yerevan, Armenian SSR, Soviet Union

Figure skating career
- Country: Soviet Union
- Began skating: 1976
- Retired: 1987

Gurgen Vardanjan (Armenian: Գուրգեն Վարդանյան, Russian: Гурген Норикович Варданян, born 18 October 1963) is an Armenian figure skating coach and former competitor for the Soviet Union. He is the 1983 Grand Prix International St. Gervais silver medalist and a two-time Prague Skate bronze medalist (1981, 1984).

== Personal life ==
Vardanjan was born on 18 October 1963 in Yerevan, Armenian SSR, Soviet Union. His sister, Asmik, is a former figure skater, and his wife, Jeranjak Ipakjan, is a skating coach and choreographer. Their son, Tigran Vardanjan, was born on 26 March 1989 in Moscow and skated for Hungary.

Vardanjan lived in Hungary from 1989 until April 2010, when he moved to Nottingham, England.

== Career ==
=== Competitive ===
Vardanjan began skating in 1976 at an outdoor rink in Yerevan. His first coach was Elena Slepova. After moving to Moscow, he was coached by Edouard Pliner and then by Elena Tchaikovskaya, from 1980 to 1986.

International
Event	81–82	82–83	83–84	84–85	85–86
Prague Skate	3rd			3rd	
Prize of Moscow News					6th
International St. Gervais			2nd		

=== Post-competitive ===
Vardanjan returned to Armenia in 1987 and became a coach at the same school where he had started skating. He began working in Hungary in December 1989, teaching at an outdoor rink before relocating to the capital, Budapest. He was based in Budapest until April 2010, when he was appointed Director of Skating at the National Ice Centre in Nottingham, England.

Vardanjan is best known for his work with Júlia Sebestyén, whom he began teaching in late 1989. He has also coached Diána Póth, Tamara Dorofejev, Tigran Vardanjan, and David Richardson.
