= Stanislav Drastich =

Czech ice dancer (born 1954)

Personal information
- Born: 14 July 1954 (age 71) Opava, Czechoslovakia
- Height: 1.78 m (5 ft 10 in)

Figure skating career
- Country: Czechoslovakia
- Retired: 1980

Stanislav Drastich (born 14 July 1954) is a former ice dancer who competed for Czechoslovakia. With Liliana Řeháková, he placed fourth at the 1979 European Championships, the 1979 World Championships, and the 1980 Winter Olympics.

== Competitive highlights ==
(with Řeháková)

International
Event	1976–77	1977–78	1978–79	1979–80
Winter Olympics				4th
World Championships	8th	5th	4th	
European Championships	7th	5th	4th	5th
Ennia Challenge Cup			1st	1st
Prague Skate			1st	1st
Rotary Watches Internat.			2nd	
Prize of Moscow News	6th			
National
Czechoslovak Champ.	1st	1st	1st	1st
WD = Withdrew
