= Jitka Babická =

Czech ice dancer

Personal information
- Other names: Jitka Potůčková
- Born: 31 July 1939 (age 86) Prague, Protectorate of Bohemia and Moravia

Figure skating career
- Country: Czechoslovakia
- Partner: Jaromír Holan
- Coach: Míla Nováková
- Retired: c. 1967
Medal record
Representing Czechoslovakia
Figure skating: Ice dance
European Championships
Bronze medal – third place	1966 Bratislava	Ice dance

Jitka Babická, married surname: Potůčková, (born 31 July 1939) is a Czech former ice dancer who represented Czechoslovakia. Competing in partnership with Jaromír Holan, she won bronze at the 1966 European Championships in Bratislava, Czechoslovakia.

== Competitive highlights ==
With Jaromír Holan

International
Event	58–59	59–60	60–61	61–62	62–63	63–64	64–65	65–66	66–67
Worlds					14th	10th		8th	11th
Europeans			10th	9th	7th	6th	7th	3rd	6th
Prague Skate							2nd	1st	1st
National
Czechoslovak	2nd	2nd	2nd	2nd	2nd	2nd	2nd	1st	1st
