= Besa Tsintsadze =

Georgian competitive figure skater

Besarion Tsintsadze
Personal information
- Born: January 15, 1969 (age 57) Tbilisi, Georgian SSR, Soviet Union

Figure skating career
- Country: Georgia
- Retired: 1995

Besarion "Besa" Tsintsadze (Georgian: ბესო ცინცაძე, born January 15, 1969) is a Georgian former competitive figure skater. He is the 1993 Karl Schäfer Memorial bronze medalist. He qualified to the final segment at three European Championships (1993, 1994, and 1995) and one World Championship (1994).

After retiring from competition, Tsintsadze performed with Disney on Ice and Ice Capades. He later became a skating coach, working with ice hockey players. After three years in New York, he moved to Pennsylvania in 2001. He married Julija Ļašenko, a former pair skater who won bronze at the 1988 World Junior Championships.

== Competitive highlights ==
International
Event	1992–93	1993–94	1994–95
World Championships	37th	19th	
European Championships	16th	15th	16th
Karl Schäfer Memorial		3rd	
