= André Bourgeois (figure skater) =

Canadian figure skater

André Bourgeois is a Canadian former competitive figure skater. He is the 1982 Prague Skate silver medalist and 1983 Nebelhorn Trophy bronze medalist. He placed 8th at the 1985 Skate Canada International. His skating club was Dieppe FSC. Bourgeois formerly served as the National Ice Skating Association's performance director. As of 2017, he is Skate Canada's NextGen Director. He has also worked as an International Skating Union technical specialist.
