= Dana Holanová =

Ice dancer

Personal information
- Other names: Dana Novotná

Figure skating career
- Country: Czechoslovakia
- Partner: Jaromír Holan; Jaroslav Hainz
- Retired: c. 1969

Dana Holanová, née Novotná, is a former ice dancer who represented Czechoslovakia. With Jaromír Holan, she is the 1967 Prague Skate silver medalist, the 1967 Prize of Moscow News bronze medalist, and a two-time Czechoslovak national champion. They finished in the top ten at three ISU Championships.

== Personal life ==
Holanová was born Dana Novotná. She married Jaromír Holan and changed her surname to Holanová (feminine form of Holan) in 1968. Their daughter, Canadian soccer player Martina Franko, was born on 13 January 1976 in Los Altos, California.

== Career ==
Novotná competed in partnership with Jaroslav Hainz during at least two seasons. The duo won bronze medals at the 1965 Blue Swords and 1966 Prize of Moscow News. They also took bronze at two Czechoslovak Championships. They placed 11th at the 1967 European Championships in Ljubljana, Yugoslavia, and 17th at the 1967 World Championships in Vienna, Austria.

Novotná teamed up with Jaromír Holan in 1967. In their first season together, they won silver at the 1967 Prague Skate, bronze at the 1967 Prize of Moscow News, and gold at the Czechoslovak Championships. They placed tenth at the 1968 European Championships in Västerås, Sweden.

The following season, she began competing as Dana Holanová. After winning their second national title, the duo placed 7th at the 1969 European Championships in Garmisch-Partenkirchen, West Germany, and 8th at the 1969 World Championships in Colorado Springs, Colorado, United States.

== Competitive highlights ==
=== With Holan ===
International
Event	1967–68	1968–69
World Championships		8th
European Championships	10th	7th
Prague Skate	2nd	
Prize of Moscow News	3rd	
National
Czechoslovak Championships	1st	1st

=== With Hainz ===
International
Event	1965–66	1966–67
World Championships		17th
European Championships		11th
Blue Swords	3rd	
Prague Skate		4th
Prize of Moscow News		3rd
National
Czechoslovak Championships	3rd	3rd
