= Fyodor Datlin =

Personal information
- Full name: Fyodor Ivanovich Datlin
- Born: 1880
- Died: December 1941 (aged 60–61) Leningrad, Soviet Union

Figure skating career
- Country: Russia → Soviet Union

Fyodor Ivanovich Datlin (Russian: Фёдор Иванович Датлин; 1880 - December 1941) was a Russian and Soviet figure skater.

Datlin was a two-time champion of Russia in men's single skating (in 1906 and 1908) and the 1905 silver medalist. In 1920 he won the gold medal at the first ever Soviet Figure Skating Championships.

He also participated in the 1909 World Figure Skating Championships in Stockholm, but did poorly, placing last of five competitors.

Datlin died in Leningrad in December 1941, during the siege of the city. He was buried in the city's Serafimovskoe Cemetery.

== Competitive highlights ==
Event	1905	1906	1907	1908	1909	1920
World Championships					5th	
Russian Championships	2nd	1st		1st		
Soviet Championships						1st
