= Radka Kovaříková =

Czech former competitive pair skater (born 1975)

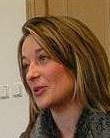
- Kovaříková in 2006

Personal information
- Born: 26 February 1975 (age 51) Brno, Czechoslovakia
- Height: 1.61 m (5 ft 3 1/2 in)

Figure skating career
- Country: Czech Republic; Czechoslovakia
- Retired: 1995
Medal record
Representing Czech Republic Czechoslovakia (until 1993)
Figure skating: Pairs
World Championships
Gold medal – first place	1995 Birmingham	Pairs
Silver medal – second place	1992 Oakland	Pairs
European Championships
Silver medal – second place	1995 Dortmund	Pairs

Radka Kovaříková (born 26 February 1975) is a Czech former competitive pair skater. With René Novotný, she is the 1995 World champion and 1995 European silver medalist.

== Personal life ==
Kovaříková was born on 6 February 1975 in Brno. She and René Novotný were engaged in 1993 and married on 1 June 1996. In 2011, Kovaříková confirmed that they had divorced. She is married to the director of Cinderella on Ice, Jindřich Šimek, with whom she has a daughter, Klára.

== Career ==
Kovaříková teamed up with René Novotný in 1988.

=== 1989–1990 season ===
They won the 1989 Prague Skate and took bronze at three events – the 1989 Nebelhorn Trophy, 1989 Grand Prix International de Paris, and 1989 Skate Electric. The pair placed sixth at the 1990 European Championships in Leningrad, Soviet Union, and 8th at the 1990 World Championships in Halifax, Nova Scotia, Canada.

=== 1990–1991 season ===
Kovaříková/Novotný won silver at the 1990 Skate America, bronze at the 1990 Nations Cup, and bronze at the 1990 Skate Electric. They placed fourth at the 1991 European Championships in Sofia, Bulgaria, and sixth at the 1991 World Championships in Munich, Germany.

=== 1991–1992 season ===
Kovaříková/Novotný received the silver medal at the 1991 Grand Prix International de Paris, bronze at the 1991 Nations Cup, and silver at the 1991 NHK Trophy. They placed third in the short program, fourth in the free skate, and fourth overall at the 1992 European Championships in Lausanne, Switzerland. They finished fourth at the 1992 Winter Olympics in Albertville, France, having ranked fourth in both segments.

They concluded their third season at the 1992 World Championships in Oakland, California. Ranked third after the short program, they overtook Canada's Isabelle Brasseur / Lloyd Eisler for the silver medal behind Natalia Mishkutionok / Artur Dmitriev (CIS). They were coached by Ivan Rezek until the end of the season.

=== 1992–1993 season ===
In autumn 1992, Kovaříková/Novotný moved to train in the United States, choosing Irina Rodnina as their coach. They took silver at two events, the 1992 Skate America and 1992 Grand Prix International de Paris. Ranked fifth in the short and third in the free, they finished fourth at the 1993 European Championships in Helsinki, Finland. They placed sixth in the short, fourth in the free, and fourth overall at the 1993 World Championships in Prague, Czech Republic.

=== 1993–1994 season ===
Kovaříková/Novotný received silver medals at the 1993 Skate Canada International and 1993 NHK Trophy. They placed third in the short program and fourth in the free skate at the European Championships in Copenhagen, Denmark; they finished just off the podium for the fourth consecutive year.

In February 1994, they placed sixth at the 1994 Winter Olympics in Hamar, Norway, having ranked fifth in the short and sixth in the free. They ended their season with a 5th-place result at the 1994 World Championships in Chiba, Japan.

=== 1994–1995 season ===
Kovaříková/Novotný won bronze at the 1994 Skate America and silver at the 1994 NHK Trophy. At the 1995 European Championships in Dortmund, Germany, the pair placed first in the short program and second in the free skate. They received the silver medal behind Germany's Mandy Wötzel / Ingo Steuer. Ranked first in both segments, they won gold at the 1995 World Championships in Birmingham, England, ahead of Russia's Evgenia Shishkova / Vadim Naumov.

=== Professional career ===
Kovaříková/Novotný turned professional in 1995. They would win the World Professional Championships in 1995 and 1997. The pair toured with Stars on Ice for one season (1996–97) and continued to skate in shows around the world for a number of years.

== Results ==
With Novotný

International
Event	88–89	89–90	90–91	91–92	92–93	93–94	94–95
Winter Olympics				4th		6th	
World Champ.		8th	6th	2nd	4th	5th	1st
European Champ.		6th	4th	4th	4th	4th	2nd
Skate America			2nd		2nd		3rd
Skate Canada						2nd	
Int. de Paris / Trophée de France		3rd		2nd	2nd		4th
NHK Trophy			6th	2nd		2nd	2nd
Nations Cup			3rd	3rd			
Nebelhorn Trophy		3rd					
Prague Skate		1st					
Skate Electric		3rd	3rd				
National
Czech Republic						1st	
Czechoslovakia	1st	1st					

International
Event	1995	1997
World Professional Championships	1st	1st
