= Yulia Bystrova =

Russian figure skater

Personal information
- Native name: Юлия Валерьевна Быстрова
- Full name: Yulia Valeryevna Bystrova
- Other names: Julia Bistrova
- Born: 10 June 1963 (age 63) Sverdlovsk, Russian SFSR, Soviet Union

Figure skating career
- Country: Soviet Union
- Partner: Alexander Tarasov; Vladimir Starostin; Mikhail Vazhenin
- Coach: Igor Ksenofontov; Ardo Rennik; Julia Rennik
- Retired: 1988

Yulia Valeryevna Bystrova (Russian: Юлия Валерьевна Быстрова, born 10 June 1963) is a former pair skater for the Soviet Union. With Alexander Tarasov, she is the 1984 Prague Skate champion, 1985 Winter Universiade silver medalist, and 1987 Grand Prix International de Paris silver medalist.

== Personal life ==
Bystrova was born on 10 June 1963 in Sverdlovsk (Yekaterinburg), Russian SFSR, Soviet Union, and is married to Alexander Tarasov. Their son, Filipp, was born in January 1992 and competed in pairs for Azerbaijan.

== Career ==
Early in her career, Bystrova skated with Mikhail Vazhenin, coached by Aleksandr Morozov and Igor Ksenofontov at DSO Sparkak in Sverdlovsk. Her next partnership, with Vladimir Starostin, lasted from 1980 to 1981.

In 1982–83, Bystrova began competing with Tarasov. The pair was coached by Julia Rennik and Ardo Rennik and represented DSO Burevestnik Sverdlovsk. They won the gold medal at the 1984 Prague Skate, silver at the 1985 Winter Universiade, bronze at the 1985 St. Ivel International, and silver at the 1987 Grand Prix International de Paris. They competed until the end of the 1987–88 season.

After retiring from competition, Bystrova turned to coaching. She is based at DYUSSH No. 8 Lokomotiv in Yekaterinburg.

== Competitive highlights ==
With Tarasov

International
| Event | 83–84 | 84–85 | 85–86 | 86–87 | 87–88 |
|---|---|---|---|---|---|
| International de Paris | | | | | 2nd |
| Prague Skate | | 1st | | | |
| Prize of Moscow News | | | 6th | 6th | |
| St. Ivel International | | | 3rd | | |
| Winter Universiade | | 2nd | | | |
National
| Soviet Championships | 6th | 5th | | 6th | 7th |
