= Cédric Monod =

Swiss pair skater

Personal information
- Born: 10 November 1974 (age 51) Lausanne, Switzerland

Figure skating career
- Country: Switzerland
- Retired: February 1994

Cédric Monod (born 10 November 1974) is a Swiss former pair skater. With his sister, Leslie Monod, he is a three-time Swiss national champion (1992–94) and placed as high as sixth at the European Championships (1993).

== Personal life ==
Born 10 November 1974 in Lausanne, Cédric Monod is the elder brother of Leslie Monod. He has three children – Ulysse, Louise, and Marcel.

A graduate of the University of Lausanne, Monod taught for six years at Collège Arnold Reymond de Pully before joining Gymnase Auguste Piccard in 2006. He is a geography and physical education teacher.

== Skating career ==
After playing defense for an ice hockey team, Cédric Monod switched to figure skating, competing in singles on the junior level and then pairs with his sister. They represented Switzerland internationally and CP Lausanne in domestic events. Their coaches included Heidemarie Steiner and Jacques Mrozek.

The Monod siblings won the first of their three Swiss national titles in 1992. They finished 8th at the 1992 European Championships in Lausanne and 12th at the 1992 World Championships in Oakland, California. The following season, they placed sixth at the 1993 European Championships in Helsinki and 9th at the 1993 World Championships in Prague. Their Worlds result allowed Switzerland to send two pair teams to the 1994 Winter Olympics.

In the 1993–94 season, the Monod siblings won their third national title but finished just out of the top ten, in 11th place, at the 1994 European Championships in Copenhagen. Following the Copenhagen result, the Swiss Olympic Association elected not to send them to the Olympics. The pair announced their competitive retirement on 3 February 1994.

Cédric Monod has worked as a skating coach, coaching Stephane Lambiel from 2004 to 2005, and as a consultant for Radio Télévision Suisse.

== Programs ==
(with Leslie Monod)

Season	Short program	Free skating
1993–1994	In the Mood by Glenn Miller	
1992–1993	Rigoletto by Giuseppe Verdi	
1991–1992	Limelight by Charlie Chaplin	

== Competitive highlights ==
(with Leslie Monod)

International
Event	1990–91	1991–92	1992–93	1993–94
World Championships		12th	9th	
European Championships		8th	6th	11th
Skate America				9th
International: Junior
World Junior Champ.	15th			
National
Swiss Championships		1st	1st	1st
