= Alexander Tarasov (figure skater) =

Russian former pair skater (born 1961)

Personal information
- Native name: Александр Васильевич Тарасов
- Full name: Alexander Vasilyevich Tarasov
- Born: 21 July 1961 (age 64) Sverdlovsk, Russian SFSR, Soviet Union

Figure skating career
- Country: Soviet Union
- Partner: Yulia Bystrova
- Coach: Svetlana Bukreyeva; Julia Rennik; Ardo Rennik
- Retired: 1988

Alexander Vasilyevich Tarasov (Russian: Алекса́ндр Васи́льевич Тара́сов, born 21 July 1961) is a Russian former pair skater who represented the Soviet Union. With Yulia Bystrova, he is the 1984 Prague Skate champion, 1985 Winter Universiade silver medalist, and 1987 Grand Prix International de Paris silver medalist.

== Personal life ==
Alexander Tarasov was born on 21 July 1961 in Sverdlovsk (Yekaterinburg), Russian SFSR, Soviet Union, and is married to Yulia Bystrova. Their son, Filipp Tarasov, was born in January 1992 and competed in pairs for Azerbaijan.

== Career ==
In his early years, Tarasov was coached by Svetlana Bukreyeva at DSO Trud in Sverdlovsk.

In 1982–83, he began competing in partnership with Yulia Bystrova. The pair was coached by Julia Rennik and Ardo Rennik and represented DSO Burevestnik Sverdlovsk. They won the gold medal at the 1984 Prague Skate, silver at the 1985 Winter Universiade, bronze at the 1985 St. Ivel International, and silver at the 1987 Grand Prix International de Paris. They competed until the end of the 1987–88 season.

After retiring from competition, Tarasov became a coach at DYUSSH Lokomotiv in Yekaterinburg.

== Competitive highlights ==
With Bystrova

International
Event	83–84	84–85	85–86	86–87	87–88
International de Paris					2nd
Prague Skate		1st			
Prize of Moscow News			6th	6th	
St. Ivel International			3rd		
Winter Universiade		2nd			
National
Soviet Championships	6th	5th		6th	7th
