= Liliana Řeháková =

Personal information
- Other names: Liliana Střechová
- Born: 10 December 1958 Prague, Czechoslovakia
- Died: 10 December 2008 (aged 50)
- Height: 1.67 m (5 ft 5 1/2 in)

Figure skating career
- Country: Czechoslovakia
- Retired: 1980

Liliana Řeháková, married name: Střechová (10 December 1958 – 10 December 2008) was a Czech ice dancer who competed for Czechoslovakia. With Stanislav Drastich, she placed fourth at the 1979 European Championships, the 1979 World Championships, and the 1980 Winter Olympics.

Střechová died suddenly on the day of her 50th birthday. She was the daughter of Dagmar Lerchová, who competed in ladies' singles at the 1948 Winter Olympics.

== Competitive highlights ==
=== Ice dance with Drastich ===
International
Event	1976–77	1977–78	1978–79	1979–80
Winter Olympics				4th
World Championships	8th	5th	4th	
European Championships	7th	5th	4th	5th
Ennia Challenge Cup			1st	1st
Prague Skate			1st	1st
Rotary Watches Internat.			2nd	
Prize of Moscow News	6th			
National
Czechoslovak Champ.	1st	1st	1st	1st
WD = Withdrew

=== Ladies' singles ===
International
Event	1972–73
Prague Skate	9th
