= Piotr Szczypa =

National ladies' figure skating coach of Germany

Piotr/Peter Szczypa
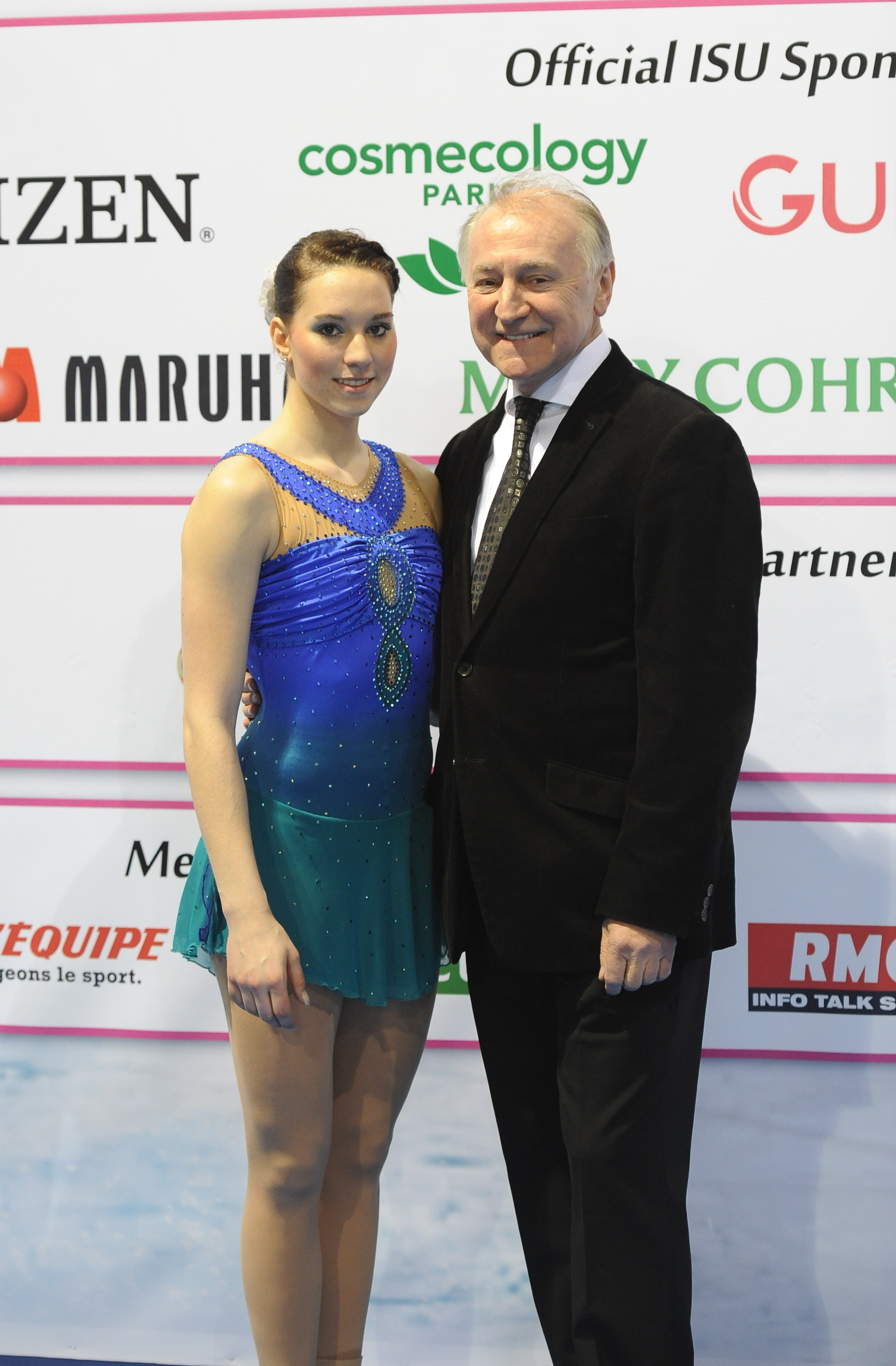
- Szczypa with Sarah Hecken at the 2012 World Championships

Personal information
- Full name: Piotr Jan Szczypa
- Other names: Sczypa
- Born: 19 April 1948 (age 78) Siemianowice Śląskie, Poland
- Home town: Katowice
- Height: 1.75 m (5 ft 9 in)

Figure skating career
- Country: Poland
- Skating club: MKS Iskra Katowice and MERC

Piotr Jan Szczypa, now known as Peter Szczypa (born 19 April 1948) is a former pair skater who competed for Poland with Janina Poremska and Teresa Skrzek. He is currently the national ladies' figure skating coach of Germany.

== Personal life ==
Szczypa was born on 19 April 1948 in Siemianowice Śląskie. His sister, Joanna Szczypa, is also a skating coach.

== Career ==
As a pair skater, Szczypa won ten Polish national titles and competed at ten European and five World Championships as well as at the Olympic Winter Games in Grenoble in 1968. Besides his figure skating career he studied international economics and sports. In 1979 he moved to Denmark where he lived for seven years before moving to Germany in 1986.

Peter Szczypa coached Claudia Leistner when she took the gold medal at the 1989 European Championships and silver at the 1989 Worlds. Since the 1990s, he is one of Germany's most successful ladies' figure skating coaches. Based in Mannheim, Szczypa coached four-time German champion Sarah Hecken at the 2010 Olympic Winter Games in Vancouver. He was also the coach of Nathalie Weinzierl who placed 9th at the 2013 European Championships. He has also coached Kristina Isaev and Jonathan Hess.

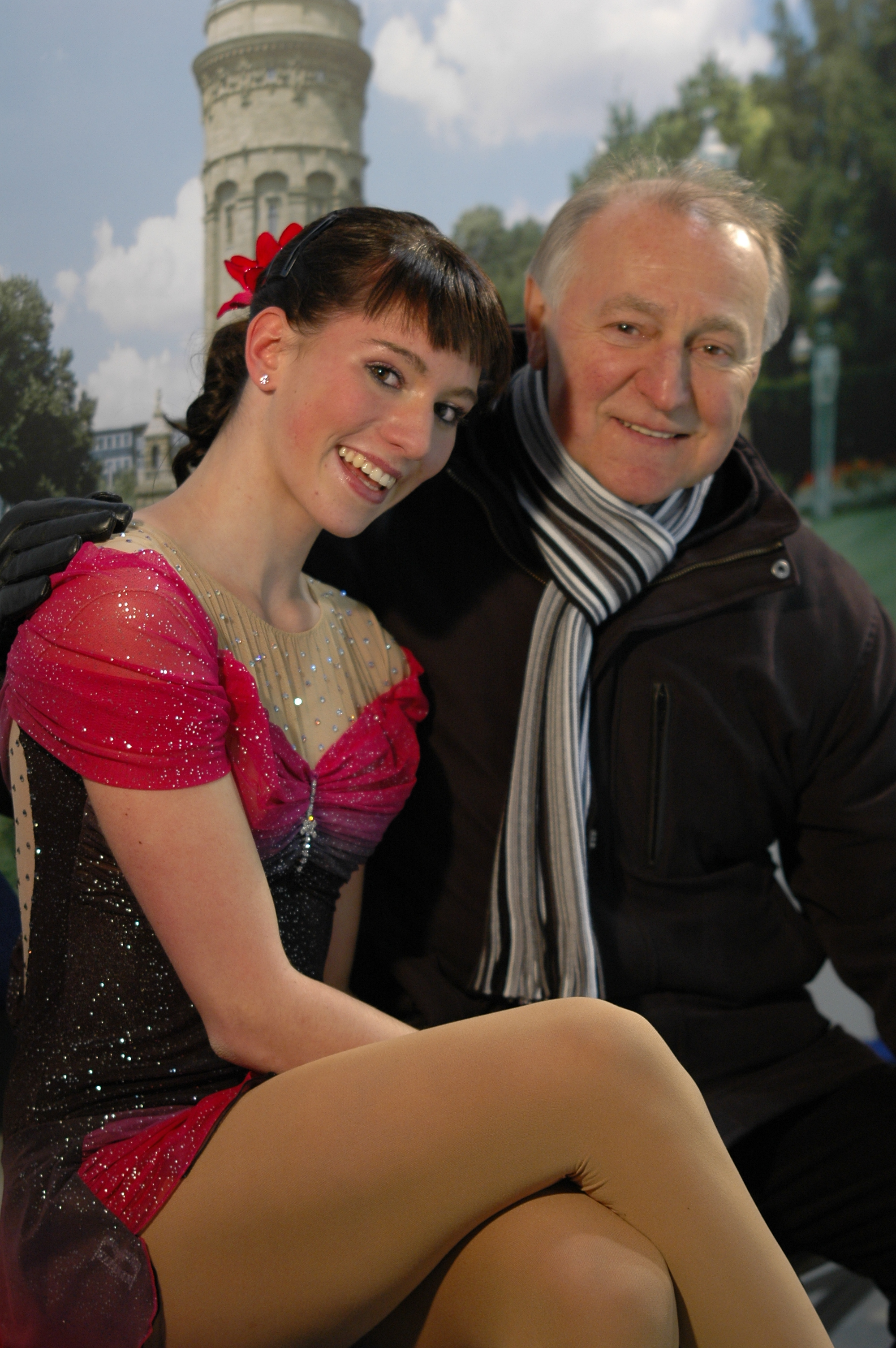
Szczypa with Sarah Hecken in December 2009

== Competitive highlights ==
=== With Poremska ===
International
Event	64–65	65–66	66–67	67–68	68–69	69–70
Winter Olympics				14th		
World Champ.			14th	16th		10th
European Champ.		18th	8th	15th	8th	9th
Prague Skate			9th	3rd		
National
Polish Champ.	1st	1st	1st	1st	1st	1st

=== With Skrzek ===
International
Event	70–71	71–72	72–73	73–74	74–75
World Champ.	17th		16th		
European Champ.	13th	12th	10th	11th	11th
Blue Swords			6th		
National
Polish Champ.			1st	1st	1st
