= Russian Figure Skating Championships =

Annual figure skating competition

- Status: Active
- Genre: National championships
- Frequency: Annual
- Country: Russia
- Previous event: 2026 Russian Championships
- Next event: 2027 Russian Championships
- Organizer: Figure Skating Federation of Russia

The Russian Figure Skating Championships (Russian: Чемпионат России по фигурному катанию) are an annual figure skating competition organized by the Figure Skating Federation of Russia (Russian: Федерация фигурного катания на коньках России) to crown the national champions of Russia. The first Russian Championships were held in 1897 in Saint Petersburg, open only to men and featuring both figure skating and speed skating. A separate competition for women debuted in 1911. The last championships prior to the Russian Revolution took place in 1915. The championships of the Russian Socialist Federative Soviet Republic took place in 1920 before the creation of the Soviet Union in 1922. During the period of Soviet control, Russian skaters competed in the Soviet Figure Skating Championships. After the collapse of the Soviet Union in 1991, separate Russian Championships resumed, and have been held without interruption since.

Medals are awarded in men's singles, women's singles, pair skating, and ice dance at the senior and junior levels. Evgeni Plushenko holds the record for winning the most Russian Championship titles in men's singles (with ten), while Maria Butyrskaya holds the record in women's singles (with six). Two teams are tied for winning the most titles in pair skating (with four each): Marina Eltsova and Andrei Bushkov, and Elena Berezhnaya and Anton Sikharulidze. Maxim Trankov also won four titles in pair skating, but not with the same partner. Ekaterina Bobrova and Dmitri Soloviev hold the record in ice dance (with seven).

== History ==
Figure skating was first introduced in Russia by Peter the Great when he brought ice skates from Western Europe. The first ice rink in Russia was opened in 1865 in the Yusupov Gardens in Saint Petersburg, which hosted the first figure skating competition in Russia in 1878. The first official Russian Championships were held in 1897; Aleksandr Panshin became the first official Russian national champion. No men's competitions were held between 1914 and 1915 due to World War I and no competitions were held at all between 1916 and 1919 due to the Russian Revolution. The Revolution was followed by a period of Soviet control in Russia, and in 1922, the establishment of the Soviet Union. Russian skaters competed at the Soviet Figure Skating Championships between 1922 and 1992. The last installment of the Soviet Championships was held in Kyiv, in what was then the Ukrainian Soviet Socialist Republic, in December 1991.

After the collapse of the Soviet Union in December 1991, the Russian Federation emerged as an independent nation. The first championships of the newly independent Russia took place in Chelyabinsk in 1993. Numerous Soviet medalists went on to have successful careers competing at the Russian Championships: Alexei Urmanov won four Russian men's titles from 1993 to 1996, Maria Butyrskaya won six women's titles between 1993 and 1999, Marina Eltsova and Andrei Bushkov won four pairs' titles between 1993 and 1998, Evgenia Shishkova and Vadim Naumov won the pairs' title in 1996, Oksana Grishuk and Evgeni Platov won the ice dance title in 1996, and Anjelika Krylova and Vladimir Fedorov won the ice dance titles in 1993 to 1994. Selection criteria for competing in the Russian Championships are vague; skaters compete in a series of events known as the Russian Grand Prix in order to advance to the Russian Championships.

== Senior medalists ==
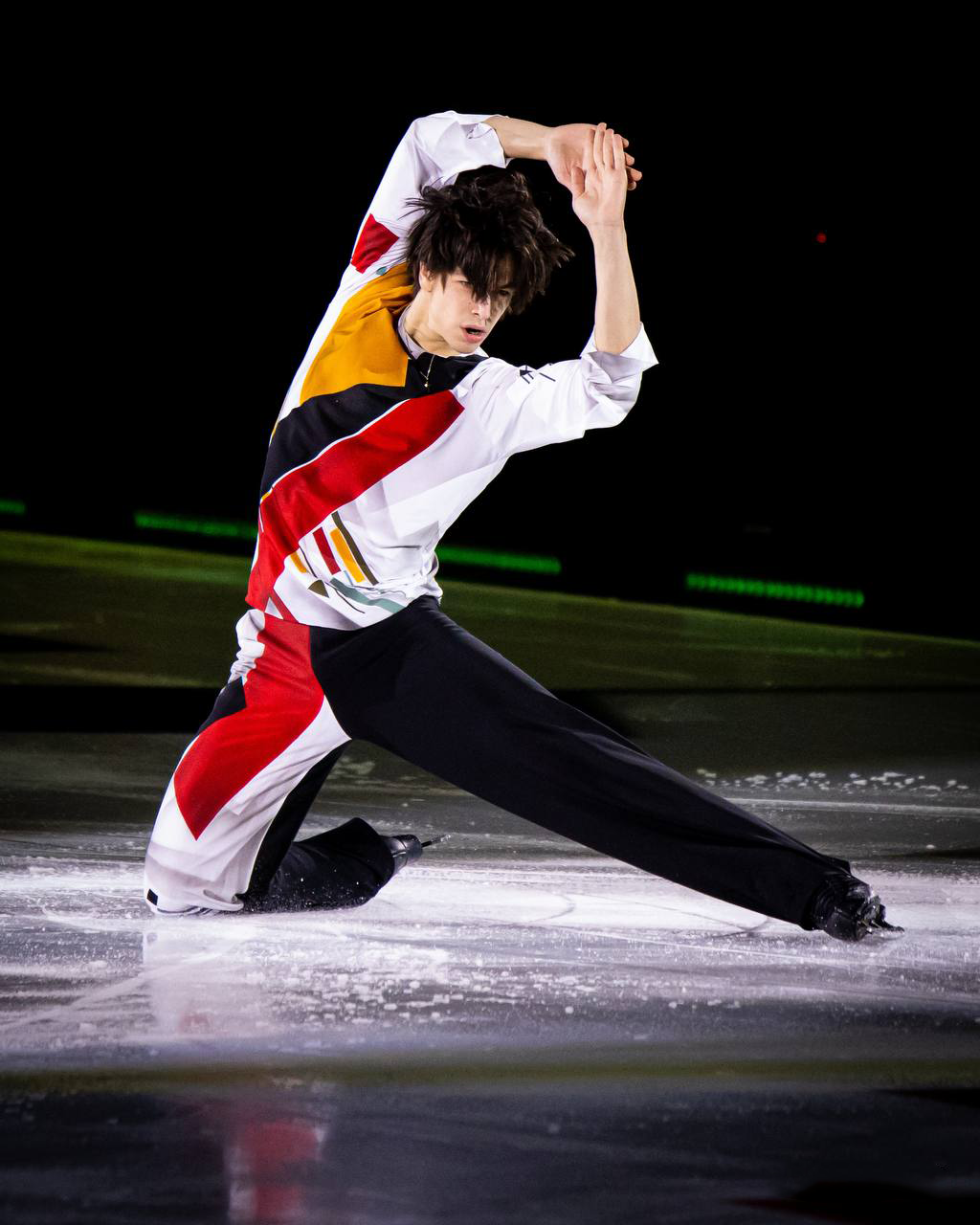
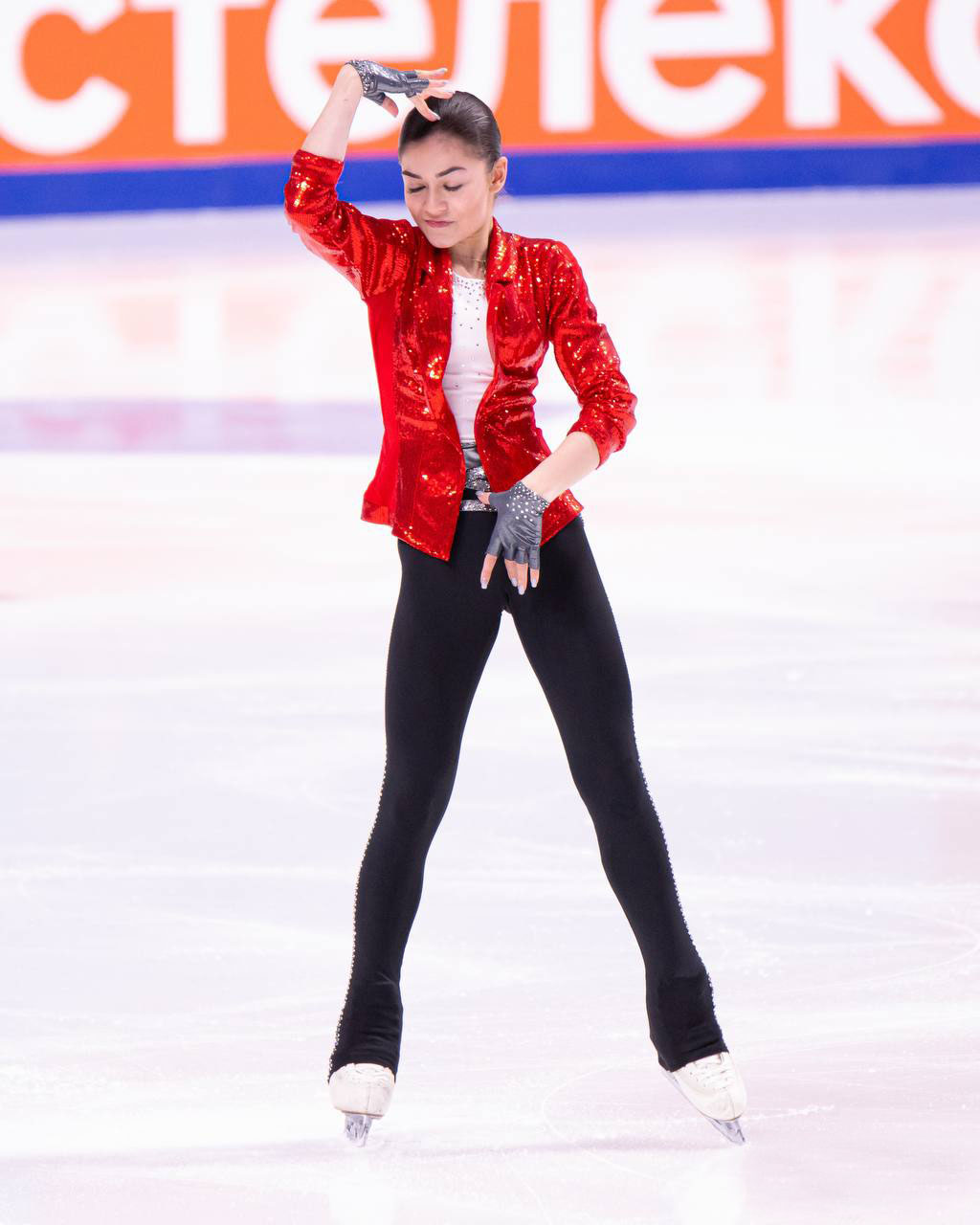
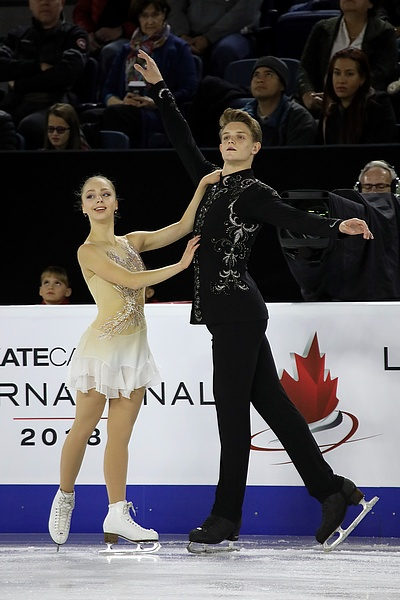
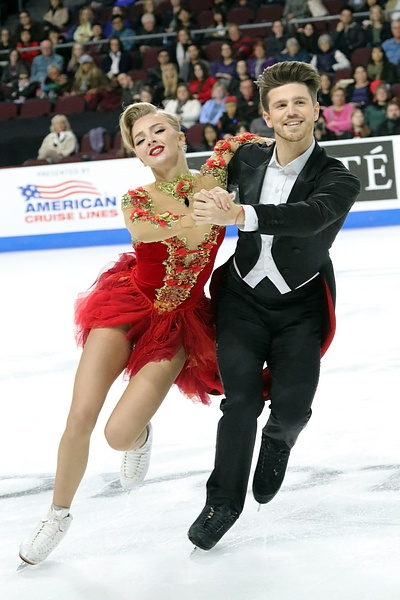
The reigning Russian figure skating champions (from left to right): Petr Gumennik (men's singles); Adeliia Petrosian (women's singles); Aleksandra Boikova and Dmitrii Kozlovskii (pair skating); and Alexandra Stepanova and Ivan Bukin (ice dance)

=== Men's singles ===
Senior men's event medalists
Year	Location	Gold	Silver	Bronze	Ref.
1897	Saint Petersburg	Alexander Panshin	No other competitors		
1898	Saint Petersburg	Alexander Panshin	No other competitors		
1899	Saint Petersburg	Alexander Panshin	No other competitors		
1900	Saint Petersburg	Alexander Panshin	No other competitors		
1901	Saint Petersburg	Nikolai Panin	No other competitors		
1902	Saint Petersburg	Nikolai Panin	No other competitors		
1903	Saint Petersburg	Nikolai Panin	No other competitors		
1904	Saint Petersburg	Nikolai Panin	No other competitors		
1905	Saint Petersburg	Nikolai Panin	Fyodor Datlin	Karl Ollo	
1906	Saint Petersburg	Fyodor Datlin	No other competitors		
1907	No competition held				
1908	Saint Petersburg	Fyodor Datlin	No other competitors		
1909	No competition held				
1910	Saint Petersburg	Karl Ollo	No other competitors		
1911	Saint Petersburg	Karl Ollo	No other competitors		
1912	Saint Petersburg	Karl Ollo	No other competitors		
1913	Saint Petersburg	Ivan Malinin	Igor Krevin	No other competitors	
1914–15	Saint Petersburg	No men's competitions due to World War I			
1916–19	No competitions due to the Russian Revolution and the Russian Civil War				
1920	Petrograd	Fyodor Datlin	Ivan Bogoyavlensky	No other competitors	
1921	No competition held				
1922–92	See Soviet Figure Skating Championships				
1993	Chelyabinsk	Alexei Urmanov	Oleg Tataurov	Roman Ekimov	
1994	Saint Petersburg	Alexei Urmanov	Oleg Tataurov	Igor Pashkevich	
1995	Moscow	Alexei Urmanov	Ilia Kulik	Oleg Tataurov	
1996	Samara	Alexei Urmanov	Ilia Kulik	Igor Pashkevich	
1997	Moscow	Ilia Kulik	Alexei Urmanov	Alexei Yagudin	
1998	Moscow	Ilia Kulik	Alexei Yagudin	Evgeni Plushenko	
1999	Moscow	Evgeni Plushenko	Alexei Yagudin	Alexei Urmanov	
2000	Moscow	Evgeni Plushenko	Alexei Yagudin	Alexander Abt	
2001	Moscow	Evgeni Plushenko	Alexei Yagudin	Alexander Abt	
2002	Moscow	Evgeni Plushenko	Alexander Abt	Ilia Klimkin	
2003	Kazan	Alexander Abt	Ilia Klimkin	Stanislav Timchenko	
2004	Saint Petersburg	Evgeni Plushenko	Ilia Klimkin	Andrei Griazev	
2005	Saint Petersburg	Evgeni Plushenko	Andrei Griazev	Andrei Lezin	
2006	Kazan	Evgeni Plushenko	Ilia Klimkin	Sergei Dobrin	
2007	Mytishchi	Andrei Griazev	Andrei Lutai	Sergei Dobrin	
2008	Saint Petersburg	Sergei Voronov	Andrei Lutai	Andrei Griazev	
2009	Kazan	Sergei Voronov	Artem Borodulin	Andrei Lutai	
2010	Saint Petersburg	Evgeni Plushenko	Sergei Voronov	Artem Borodulin	
2011	Saransk	Konstantin Menshov	Artur Gachinski	Zhan Bush	
2012	Saransk	Evgeni Plushenko	Artur Gachinski	Sergei Voronov	
2013	Sochi	Evgeni Plushenko	Sergei Voronov	Konstantin Menshov	
2014	Sochi	Maxim Kovtun	Evgeni Plushenko	Sergei Voronov	
2015	Sochi	Maxim Kovtun	Sergei Voronov	Adian Pitkeev	
2016	Yekaterinburg	Maxim Kovtun	Mikhail Kolyada	Alexander Petrov	
2017	Chelyabinsk	Mikhail Kolyada	Alexander Samarin	Maxim Kovtun	
2018	Saint Petersburg	Mikhail Kolyada	Alexander Samarin	Dmitri Aliev	
2019	Saransk	Maxim Kovtun	Mikhail Kolyada	Alexander Samarin	
2020	Krasnoyarsk	Dmitri Aliev	Artur Danielian	Alexander Samarin	
2021	Chelyabinsk	Mikhail Kolyada	Makar Ignatov	Mark Kondratiuk	
2022	Saint Petersburg	Mark Kondratiuk	Mikhail Kolyada	Andrei Mozalev	
2023	Krasnoyarsk	Evgeni Semenenko	Petr Gumennik	Alexander Samarin	
2024	Chelyabinsk	Evgeni Semenenko	Vladislav Dikidzhi	Petr Gumennik	
2025	Omsk	Vladislav Dikidzhi	Gleb Lutfullin	Evgeni Semenenko	
2026	Saint Petersburg	Petr Gumennik	Evgeni Semenenko	Mark Kondratiuk	

=== Women's singles ===
Senior women's event medalists
Year	Location	Gold	Silver	Bronze	Ref.
1911	Saint Petersburg	Xenia Caesar	Lidia Popova	No other competitors	
1912	Saint Petersburg	Xenia Caesar	No other competitors		
1913	Saint Petersburg	Xenia Caesar	No other competitors		
1914	Saint Petersburg	Xenia Caesar	No other competitors		
1915	Saint Petersburg	Xenia Caesar	No other competitors		
1916–19	No competitions due to the Russian Revolution and the Russian Civil War				
1920	Petrograd	No women's competitors			
1921	No competition held				
1922–92	See Soviet Figure Skating Championships				
1993	Chelyabinsk	Maria Butyrskaya	Julia Vorobieva	Tatiana Rachkova	
1994	Saint Petersburg	Olga Markova	Maria Butyrskaya	Irina Slutskaya	
1995	Moscow	Maria Butyrskaya	Olga Markova	Irina Slutskaya	
1996	Samara	Maria Butyrskaya	Irina Slutskaya	Olga Markova	
1997	Moscow	Maria Butyrskaya	Olga Markova	Irina Slutskaya	
1998	Moscow	Maria Butyrskaya	Julia Soldatova	Elena Sokolova	
1999	Moscow	Maria Butyrskaya	Julia Soldatova	Viktoria Volchkova	
2000	Moscow	Irina Slutskaya	Maria Butyrskaya	Viktoria Volchkova	
2001	Moscow	Irina Slutskaya	Viktoria Volchkova	Maria Butyrskaya	
2002	Moscow	Irina Slutskaya	Maria Butyrskaya	Viktoria Volchkova	
2003	Kazan	Elena Sokolova	Irina Slutskaya	Tatiana Basova	
2004	Saint Petersburg	Elena Sokolova	Julia Soldatova	Kristina Oblasova	
2005	Saint Petersburg	Irina Slutskaya	Elena Sokolova	Lilia Biktagirova	
2006	Kazan	Elena Sokolova	Viktoria Volchkova	Lilia Biktagirova	
2007	Mytishchi	Ksenia Doronina	Alexandra Ievleva	Elena Sokolova	
2008	Saint Petersburg	Ksenia Doronina	Nina Petushkova	Olga Naidenova	
2009	Kazan	Adelina Sotnikova	Elizaveta Tuktamysheva	Katarina Gerboldt	
2010	Saint Petersburg	Ksenia Makarova	Alena Leonova	Elizaveta Tuktamysheva	
2011	Saransk	Adelina Sotnikova	Alena Leonova	Elizaveta Tuktamysheva	
2012	Saransk	Adelina Sotnikova	Yulia Lipnitskaya	Alena Leonova	
2013	Sochi	Elizaveta Tuktamysheva	Elena Radionova	Adelina Sotnikova	
2014	Sochi	Adelina Sotnikova	Yulia Lipnitskaya	Elena Radionova	
2015	Sochi	Elena Radionova	Elizaveta Tuktamysheva	Evgenia Medvedeva	
2016	Yekaterinburg	Evgenia Medvedeva	Elena Radionova	Anna Pogorilaya	
2017	Chelyabinsk	Evgenia Medvedeva	Alina Zagitova	Maria Sotskova	
2018	Saint Petersburg	Alina Zagitova	Maria Sotskova	Alena Kostornaia	
2019	Saransk	Anna Shcherbakova	Alexandra Trusova	Alena Kostornaia	
2020	Krasnoyarsk	Anna Shcherbakova	Alena Kostornaia	Alexandra Trusova	
2021	Chelyabinsk	Anna Shcherbakova	Kamila Valieva	Alexandra Trusova	
2022	Saint Petersburg	Alexandra Trusova	Anna Shcherbakova	Adeliia Petrosian	
2023	Krasnoyarsk	Sofia Akateva	Elizaveta Tuktamysheva	Sofia Muravieva	
2024	Chelyabinsk	Adeliia Petrosian	Sofia Muravieva	Kseniia Sinitsyna	
2025	Omsk	Adeliia Petrosian	Daria Sadkova	Alina Gorbacheva	
2026	Saint Petersburg	Adeliia Petrosian	Alisa Dvoeglazova	Mariia Zakharova	

=== Pair skating ===
Evgenia Shishkova and Vadim Naumov, the 1996 Russian Champions in pair skating, were returning from the 2025 U.S. Figure Skating Championships aboard American Airlines Flight 5342 when their airplane collided with a helicopter upon approach to Ronald Reagan Washington National Airport and plunged into the Potomac River. All aboard were killed, including twenty-eight skaters, coaches, and family members returning from the U.S. Championships.

Senior pairs event medalists
Year	Location	Gold	Silver	Bronze	Ref.
1993	Chelyabinsk	Marina Eltsova; Andrei Bushkov	Elena Tobiash; Sergei Smirnov	Natalia Krestianinova; Alexei Torchinski	
1994	Saint Petersburg	Ekaterina Gordeeva; Sergei Grinkov	Natalia Mishkutionok; Artur Dmitriev	Evgenia Shishkova; Vadim Naumov	
1995	Moscow	Marina Eltsova; Andrei Bushkov	Maria Petrova; Anton Sikharulidze	Natalia Krestianinova; Alexei Torchinski	
1996	Samara	Evgenia Shishkova; Vadim Naumov	Marina Eltsova; Andrei Bushkov	Oksana Kazakova; Artur Dmitriev	
1997	Moscow	Marina Eltsova; Andrei Bushkov	Elena Berezhnaya; Anton Sikharulidze	Evgenia Shishkova; Vadim Naumov	
1998	Moscow	Marina Eltsova; Andrei Bushkov	Elena Berezhnaya; Anton Sikharulidze	Oksana Kazakova; Artur Dmitriev	
1999	Moscow	Elena Berezhnaya; Anton Sikharulidze	Maria Petrova; Alexei Tikhonov	Tatiana Totmianina; Maxim Marinin	
2000	Moscow	Elena Berezhnaya; Anton Sikharulidze	Maria Petrova; Alexei Tikhonov	Tatiana Totmianina; Maxim Marinin	
2001	Moscow	Elena Berezhnaya; Anton Sikharulidze	Maria Petrova; Alexei Tikhonov	Tatiana Totmianina; Maxim Marinin	
2002	Moscow	Elena Berezhnaya; Anton Sikharulidze	Tatiana Totmianina; Maxim Marinin	Maria Petrova; Alexei Tikhonov	
2003	Kazan	Tatiana Totmianina; Maxim Marinin	Maria Petrova; Alexei Tikhonov	Julia Obertas; Alexei Sokolov	
2004	Saint Petersburg	Tatiana Totmianina; Maxim Marinin	Maria Petrova; Alexei Tikhonov	Julia Obertas; Alexei Sokolov	
2005	Saint Petersburg	Tatiana Totmianina; Maxim Marinin	Maria Petrova; Alexei Tikhonov	Julia Obertas; Alexei Sokolov	
2006	Kazan	Maria Petrova; Alexei Tikhonov	Julia Obertas; Sergei Slavnov	Maria Mukhortova; Maxim Trankov	
2007	Mytishchi	Maria Mukhortova; Maxim Trankov	Julia Obertas; Sergei Slavnov	Elena Efaeva; Alexei Menshikov	
2008	Saint Petersburg	Yuko Kavaguti; Alexander Smirnov	Maria Mukhortova; Maxim Trankov	Arina Ushakova; Sergei Karev	
2009	Kazan	Yuko Kavaguti; Alexander Smirnov	Maria Mukhortova; Maxim Trankov	Lubov Iliushechkina; Nodari Maisuradze	
2010	Saint Petersburg	Yuko Kavaguti; Alexander Smirnov	Maria Mukhortova; Maxim Trankov	Vera Bazarova; Yuri Larionov	
2011	Saransk	Tatiana Volosozhar; Maxim Trankov	Yuko Kavaguti; Alexander Smirnov	Vera Bazarova; Yuri Larionov	
2012	Saransk	Vera Bazarova; Yuri Larionov	Ksenia Stolbova; Fedor Klimov	Anastasia Martiusheva; Alexei Rogonov	
2013	Sochi	Tatiana Volosozhar; Maxim Trankov	Yuko Kavaguti; Alexander Smirnov	Ksenia Stolbova; Fedor Klimov	
2014	Sochi	Ksenia Stolbova; Fedor Klimov	Vera Bazarova; Yuri Larionov	Maria Vigalova; Egor Zakroev	
2015	Sochi	Ksenia Stolbova; Fedor Klimov	Evgenia Tarasova; Vladimir Morozov	Yuko Kavaguti; Alexander Smirnov	
2016	Yekaterinburg	Tatiana Volosozhar; Maxim Trankov	Yuko Kavaguti; Alexander Smirnov	Evgenia Tarasova; Vladimir Morozov	
2017	Chelyabinsk	Ksenia Stolbova; Fedor Klimov	Evgenia Tarasova; Vladimir Morozov	Natalia Zabiiako; Alexander Enbert	
2018	Saint Petersburg	Evgenia Tarasova; Vladimir Morozov	Ksenia Stolbova; Fedor Klimov	Natalia Zabiiako; Alexander Enbert	
2019	Saransk	Evgenia Tarasova; Vladimir Morozov	Natalia Zabiiako; Alexander Enbert	Aleksandra Boikova; Dmitrii Kozlovskii	
2020	Krasnoyarsk	Aleksandra Boikova; Dmitrii Kozlovskii	Evgenia Tarasova; Vladimir Morozov	Daria Pavliuchenko; Denis Khodykin	
2021	Chelyabinsk	Evgenia Tarasova; Vladimir Morozov	Aleksandra Boikova; Dmitrii Kozlovskii	Daria Pavliuchenko; Denis Khodykin	
2022	Saint Petersburg	Anastasia Mishina; Aleksandr Galliamov	Aleksandra Boikova; Dmitrii Kozlovskii	Evgenia Tarasova; Vladimir Morozov	
2023	Krasnoyarsk	Aleksandra Boikova; Dmitrii Kozlovskii	Anastasia Mishina; Aleksandr Galliamov	Evgenia Tarasova; Vladimir Morozov	
2024	Chelyabinsk	Anastasia Mishina; Aleksandr Galliamov	Aleksandra Boikova; Dmitrii Kozlovskii	Ekaterina Chikmareva; Matvei Ianchenkov	
2025	Omsk	Anastasia Mishina; Aleksandr Galliamov	Aleksandra Boikova; Dmitrii Kozlovskii	Natalia Khabibullina; Ilya Knyazhuk	
2026	Saint Petersburg	Aleksandra Boikova; Dmitrii Kozlovskii	Anastasia Mishina; Aleksandr Galliamov	Ekaterina Chikmareva; Matvei Ianchenkov	

=== Ice dance ===
Senior ice dance event medalists
Year	Location	Gold	Silver	Bronze	Ref.
1993	Chelyabinsk	Anjelika Krylova; Vladimir Fedorov	Elena Kustarova; Oleg Ovsyannikov	Olga Ganicheva; Maksim Kachanov	
1994	Saint Petersburg	Anjelika Krylova; Vladimir Fedorov	Elena Kustarova; Oleg Ovsyannikov	Irina Lobacheva; Ilia Averbukh	
1995	Moscow	Anjelika Krylova; Oleg Ovsyannikov	Elena Kustarova; Vazgen Azrojan	Irina Lobacheva; Ilia Averbukh	
1996	Samara	Oksana Grishuk; Evgeni Platov	Anjelika Krylova; Oleg Ovsyannikov	Irina Lobacheva; Ilia Averbukh	
1997	Moscow	Irina Lobacheva; Ilia Averbukh	Olga Sharutenko; Dmitri Naumkin	Ekaterina Davydova; Roman Kostomarov	
1998	Moscow	Anjelika Krylova; Oleg Ovsyannikov	Irina Lobacheva; Ilia Averbukh	Anna Semenovich; Vladimir Fedorov	
1999	Moscow	Anjelika Krylova; Oleg Ovsyannikov	Irina Lobacheva; Ilia Averbukh	Tatiana Navka; Roman Kostomarov	
2000	Moscow	Irina Lobacheva; Ilia Averbukh	Anna Semenovich; Roman Kostomarov	Oksana Potdykova; Denis Petukhov	
2001	Moscow	Irina Lobacheva; Ilia Averbukh	Tatiana Navka; Roman Kostomarov	Natalia Romaniuta; Daniil Barantsev	
2002	Moscow	Irina Lobacheva; Ilia Averbukh	Tatiana Navka; Roman Kostomarov	Natalia Romaniuta; Daniil Barantsev	
2003	Kazan	Tatiana Navka; Roman Kostomarov	Svetlana Kulikova; Arseni Markov	Oksana Domnina; Maxim Shabalin	
2004	Saint Petersburg	Tatiana Navka; Roman Kostomarov	Oksana Domnina; Maxim Shabalin	Svetlana Kulikova; Vitali Novikov	
2005	Saint Petersburg	Oksana Domnina; Maxim Shabalin	Svetlana Kulikova; Vitali Novikov	Jana Khokhlova; Sergei Novitski	
2006	Kazan	Tatiana Navka; Roman Kostomarov	Oksana Domnina; Maxim Shabalin	Jana Khokhlova; Sergei Novitski	
2007	Mytishchi	Oksana Domnina; Maxim Shabalin	Jana Khokhlova; Sergei Novitski	Ekaterina Rubleva; Ivan Shefer	
2008	Saint Petersburg	Jana Khokhlova; Sergei Novitski	Ekaterina Rubleva; Ivan Shefer	Ekaterina Bobrova; Dmitri Soloviev	
2009	Kazan	Jana Khokhlova; Sergei Novitski	Ekaterina Rubleva; Ivan Shefer	Kristina Gorshkova; Vitali Butikov	
2010	Saint Petersburg	Oksana Domnina; Maxim Shabalin	Ekaterina Bobrova; Dmitri Soloviev	Ekaterina Rubleva; Ivan Shefer	
2011	Saransk	Ekaterina Bobrova; Dmitri Soloviev	Ekaterina Riazanova; Ilia Tkachenko	Elena Ilinykh; Nikita Katsalapov	
2012	Saransk	Ekaterina Bobrova; Dmitri Soloviev	Elena Ilinykh; Nikita Katsalapov	Ekaterina Riazanova; Ilia Tkachenko	
2013	Sochi	Ekaterina Bobrova; Dmitri Soloviev	Elena Ilinykh; Nikita Katsalapov	Ekaterina Riazanova; Ilia Tkachenko	
2014	Sochi	Ekaterina Bobrova; Dmitri Soloviev	Elena Ilinykh; Nikita Katsalapov	Victoria Sinitsina; Ruslan Zhiganshin	
2015	Sochi	Elena Ilinykh; Ruslan Zhiganshin	Ksenia Monko; Kirill Khaliavin	Alexandra Stepanova; Ivan Bukin	
2016	Yekaterinburg	Ekaterina Bobrova; Dmitri Soloviev	Victoria Sinitsina; Nikita Katsalapov	Alexandra Stepanova; Ivan Bukin	
2017	Chelyabinsk	Ekaterina Bobrova; Dmitri Soloviev	Alexandra Stepanova; Ivan Bukin	Victoria Sinitsina; Nikita Katsalapov	
2018	Saint Petersburg	Ekaterina Bobrova; Dmitri Soloviev	Alexandra Stepanova; Ivan Bukin	Tiffany Zahorski; Jonathan Guerreiro	
2019	Saransk	Victoria Sinitsina; Nikita Katsalapov	Alexandra Stepanova; Ivan Bukin	Sofia Evdokimova; Egor Bazin	
2020	Krasnoyarsk	Victoria Sinitsina; Nikita Katsalapov	Alexandra Stepanova; Ivan Bukin	Tiffany Zahorski; Jonathan Guerreiro	
2021	Chelyabinsk	Alexandra Stepanova; Ivan Bukin	Tiffany Zahorski; Jonathan Guerreiro	Anastasia Skoptsova; Kirill Aleshin	
2022	Saint Petersburg	Alexandra Stepanova; Ivan Bukin	Diana Davis; Gleb Smolkin	Elizaveta Khudaiberdieva; Egor Bazin	
2023	Krasnoyarsk	Elizaveta Khudaiberdieva; Egor Bazin	Elizaveta Shanaeva; Pavel Drozd	Elizaveta Pasechnik; Maxim Nekrasov	
2024	Chelyabinsk	Alexandra Stepanova; Ivan Bukin	Elizaveta Khudaiberdieva; Egor Bazin	Irina Khavronina; Devid Naryzhnyy	
2025	Omsk	Alexandra Stepanova; Ivan Bukin	Elizaveta Khudaiberdieva; Egor Bazin	Irina Khavronina; Devid Naryzhnyy	
2026	Saint Petersburg	Alexandra Stepanova; Ivan Bukin	Vasilisa Kaganovskaia; Maxim Nekrasov	Elizaveta Pasechnik; Dario Cirisano	

== Records ==
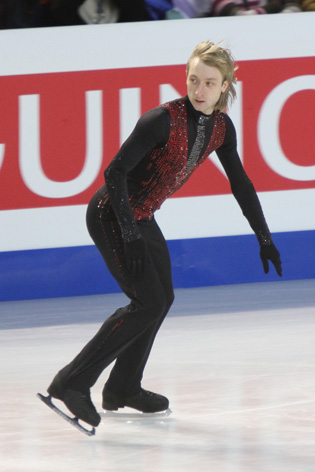
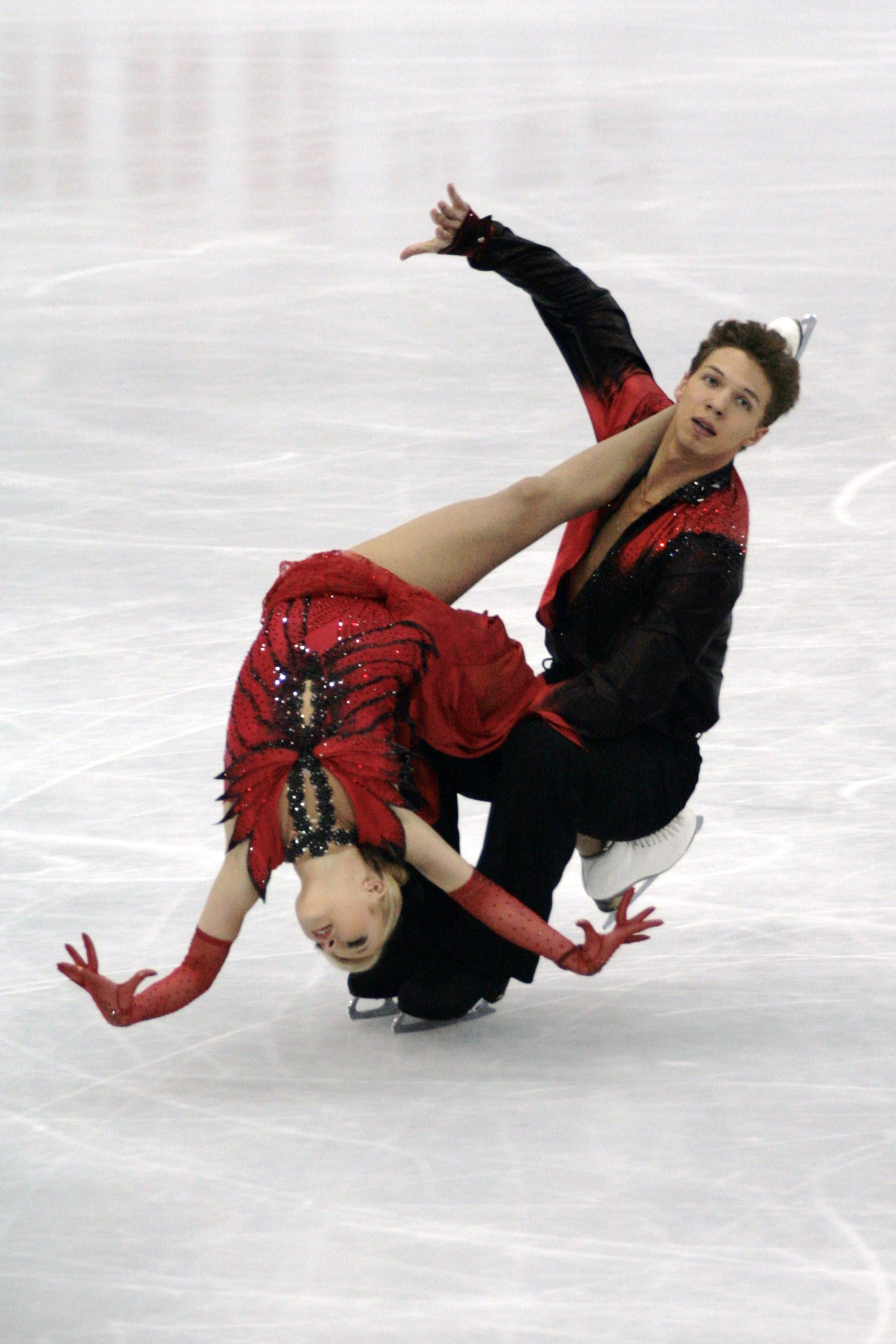
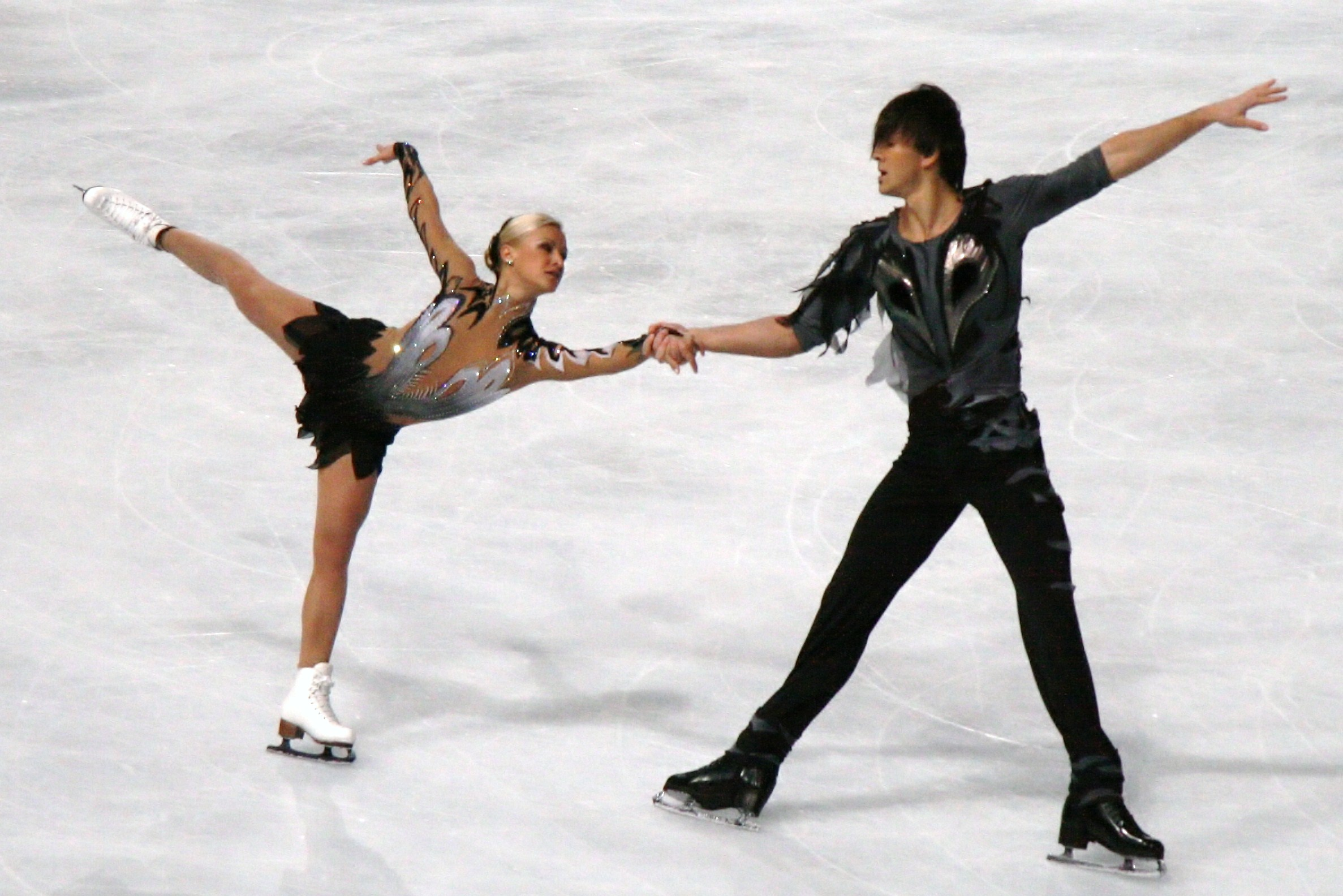
From left to right: Evgeni Plushenko won ten Russian Championship titles in men's singles; Ekaterina Bobrova and Dmitri Soloviev won seven Russian Championship titles in ice dance; and Maxim Trankov won four Russian Championship titles in pair skating, three of which were with Tatiana Volosozhar.

Records
Discipline	Most championship titles			
Discipline	Skater(s)	No.	Years	Ref.
Men's singles	Evgeni Plushenko	10	1999–2002; 2004–06; 2010; 2012–13	
Women's singles	Maria Butyrskaya	6	1993; 1995–99	
Pairs	Elena Berezhnaya; Anton Sikharulidze	4	1999–2002	
Pairs	Marina Eltsova; Andrei Bushkov	4	1993; 1995; 1997–98	
Pairs	Maxim Trankov; (Note: Maxim Trankov won one championship title while partnered with Maria Mukhortova (2007), and three with Tatiana Volosozhar (2011, 2013, 2016).)	4	2007; 2011; 2013; 2016	
Ice dance	Ekaterina Bobrova; Dmitri Soloviev	7	2011–14; 2016–18	
