= Sergei Smirnov (figure skater) =

Russian former pair skater

Personal information
- Born: 1975 (age 50–51)

Figure skating career
- Country: Russia

Sergei Smirnov (Russian: Сергей Борисович Смирнов, b. 1975) is a Russian former pair skater. With partner Elena Tobiash, he placed seventh at the 1993 European Championships in Helsinki.

== Competitive highlights ==
(with Tobiash)

International
Event	1992–93	1993–94	1994–95
European Championships	7th		
Nations Cup			5th
NHK Trophy		9th	
Prague Skate			3rd
National
Russian Championships	2nd		5th
