= Jaromír Holan =

Czech ice dancer (born 1941)

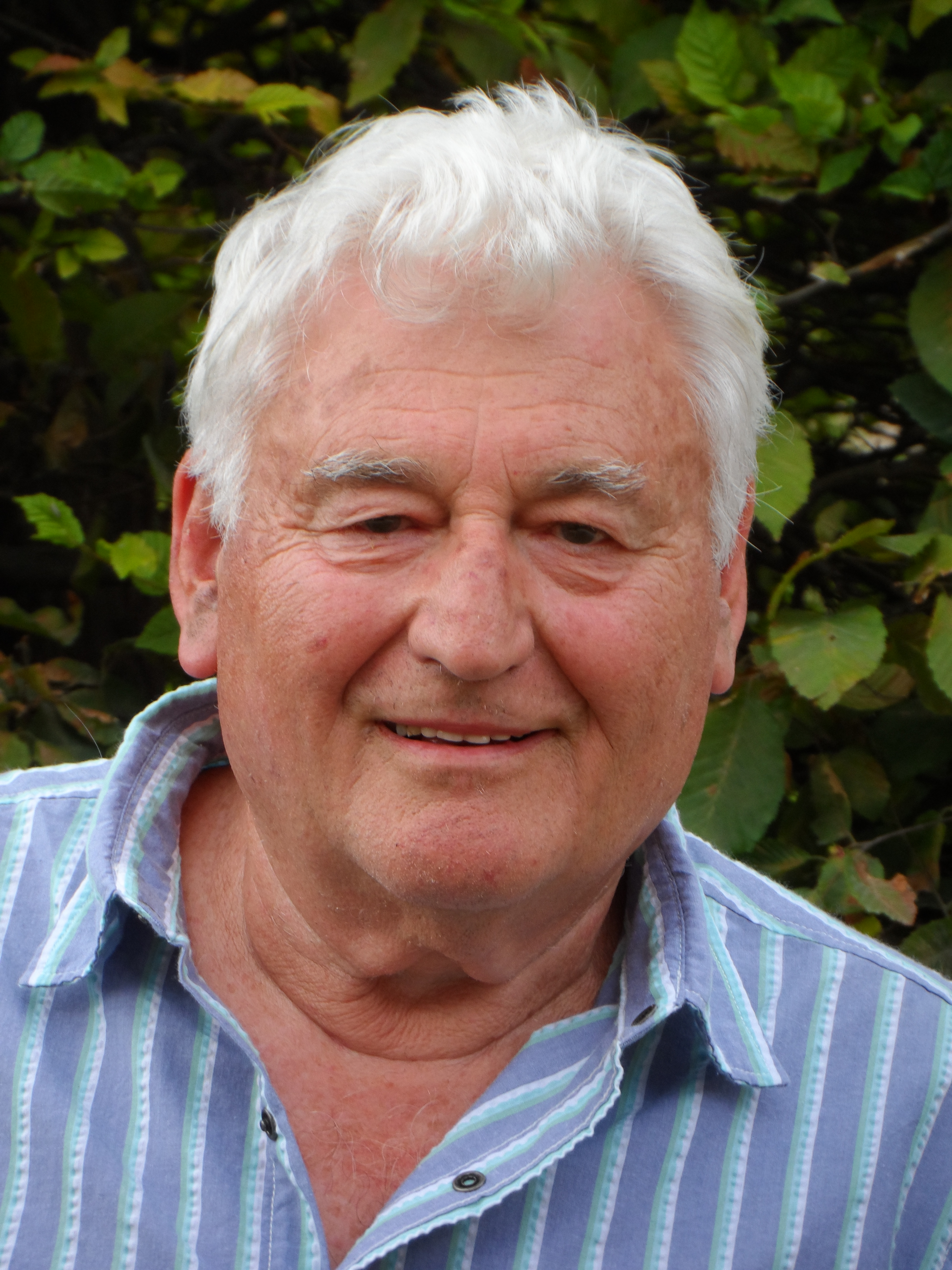
- Holan in 2015

Personal information
- Born: 14 May 1941 (age 85) Prague, Protectorate of Bohemia and Moravia

Figure skating career
- Country: Czechoslovakia
- Partner: Dana Holanová (Novotná); Jitka Babická
- Retired: c. 1969
Medal record
Representing Czechoslovakia
Figure skating: Ice dance
European Championships
Bronze medal – third place	1966 Bratislava	Ice dance

Jaromír Holan (born 14 May 1941 in Prague) is a Czech former ice dancer who represented Czechoslovakia. Competing in partnership with Jitka Babická, he won bronze at the 1966 European Championships in Bratislava, Czechoslovakia.

By 1968, Holan had teamed up with Dana Novotná. After their marriage, she competed as Dana Holanová. The duo won two national titles and placed 8th at the 1969 World Championships. After retiring from competition, Holan emigrated to the United States and became a skating coach in Ohio.

== Competitive highlights ==
=== Ice dance with Dana Novotná ===
Event	1968	1969
World Championships		8th
European Championships	10th	7th
Czechoslovak Championships	1st	1st

=== Ice dance with Jitka Babická ===
Event	1959	1960	1961	1962	1963	1964	1965	1966	1967	1968
World Championships					14th	10th		8th	11th	
European Championships			10th	9th	7th	6th	7th	3rd	6th	
Prague Skate						2nd	2nd	1st	1st	3rd
Czechoslovak Championships	2nd	2nd	2nd	2nd	2nd	2nd	2nd	1st	1st	

=== Men's singles ===
Event	1958	1959	1960	1961
Czechoslovak Championships	3rd	3rd	3rd	3rd
