= Alexander Panshin =

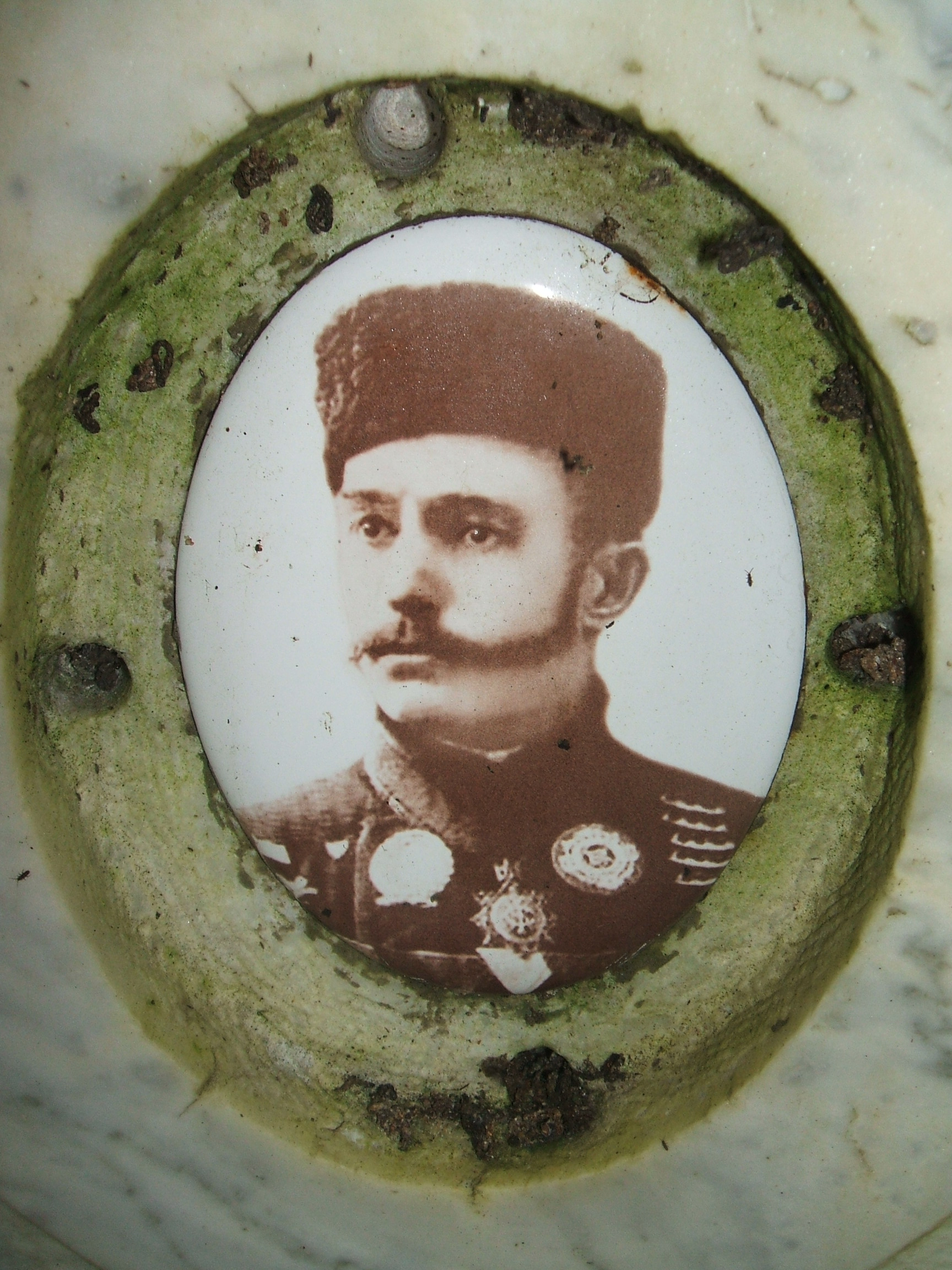

Personal information
- Full name: Alexander Nikitich Panshin
- Born: 1863 Sestroretsk
- Died: 1904 (aged 40–41) Sestroretsk

Figure skating career
- Country: Russia
Medal record
Representing Russia
Men's Figure skating
Russian Championships
Gold medal – first place	1897 Saint Petersburg	Men's singles

Alexander Nikitich Panshin (1863–1904) was a Russian speed skater and figure skater.

== Career ==
In 1889, Panshin won the unofficial World speed skating title. He won several European Championship titles. He was the first Russian champion in figure skating, winning titles from 1897 to 1900.

== Results ==
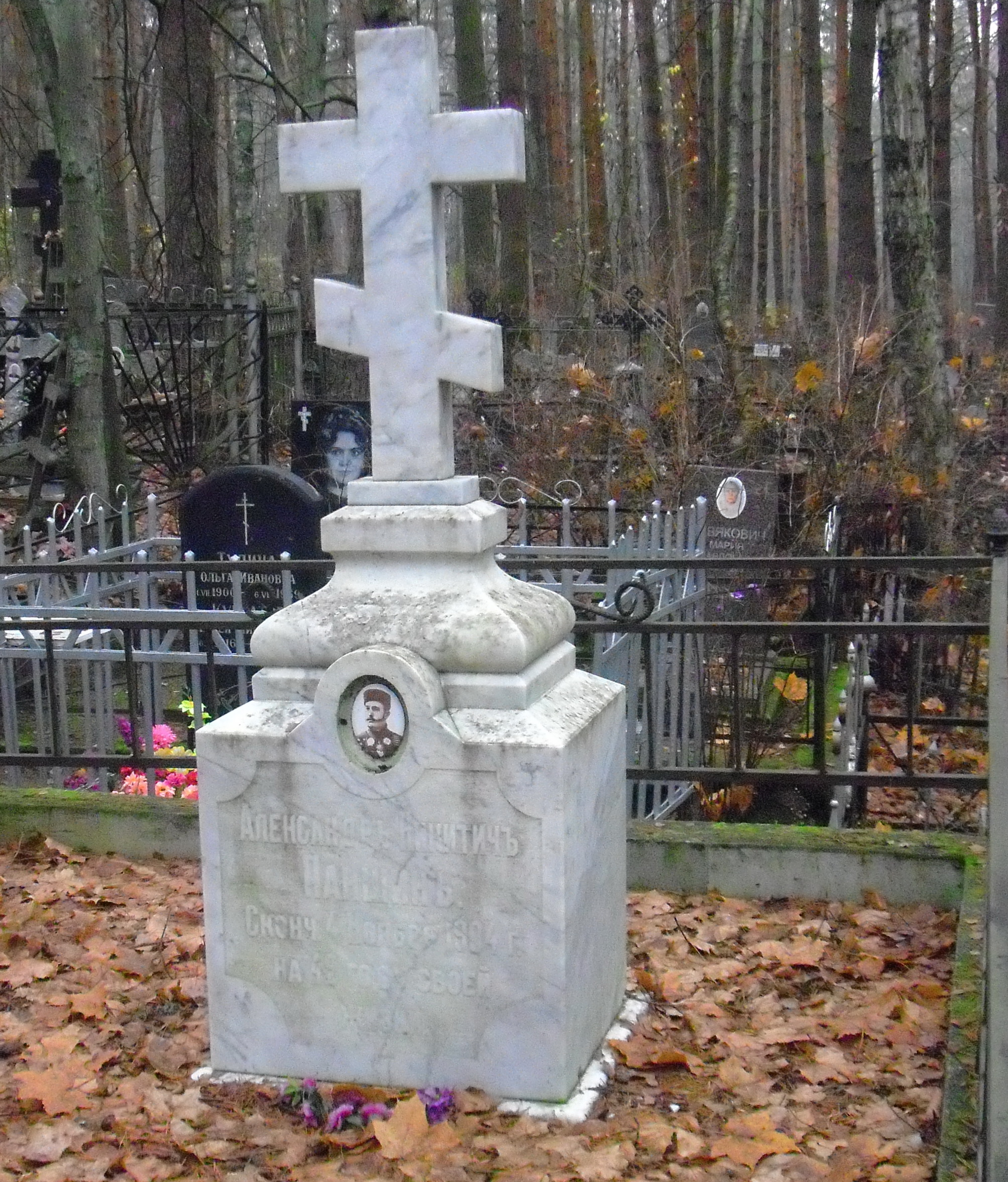
Panshin tombstone in Sestroretsk

Event	1897	1898	1899	1900
Russian Championships	1st	1st	1st	1st
