= Olga Markova (figure skater) =

Russian figure skater

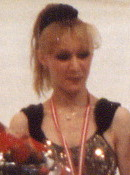
- Markova in 1993

Personal information
- Native name: Ольга Дмитриевна Маркова
- Full name: Olga Dmitriyevna Markova
- Born: 22 January 1974 (age 52) Leningrad, Russian SFSR, Soviet Union
- Height: 1.60 m (5 ft 3 in)

Figure skating career
- Country: Russia
- Skating club: CSKA
- Retired: 1998
Medal record
Figure skating: Ladies' singles
Representing Russia
European Championships
Silver medal – second place	1995 Dortmund	Singles
Bronze medal – third place	1994 Copenhagen	Singles
Russian Championships
Gold medal – first place	1994 Saint Petersburg	Singles
Silver medal – second place	1995 Moscow	Singles
Silver medal – second place	1997 Moscow	Singles
Bronze medal – third place	1996 Samara	Singles

Olga Dmitriyevna Markova (Russian: Ольга Дмитриевна Маркова; born 22 January 1974) is a Russian former competitive figure skater who currently works as a coach, choreographer, and technical specialist. She is a two-time European medalist (bronze in 1994 and silver in 1995), and the 1994 Russian national champion.

== Career ==
Markova drew attention for her avant garde style and choreography. For example, her free skating program at Skate Canada in 1993, which she choreographed, emphasized the angular, straight-lined, and twisting shapes she made with her body, especially her long, thin arms and legs. Her costume was a streamlined solid-black dress and tights and produced a futuristic image consistent with the electronic music. Figure skating writer and historian Ellyn Kestnbaum called Markova's free skating program "an abstract program, focused on stark geometric shapes and direct movement qualities rather than on the classical moves or flowiness associated with traditional femininity". She came in third place overall at Skate Canada.

Her highest placement at the World Figure Skating Championships was fifth, which she achieved in 1995. That year she was second after the short program, ahead of the eventual gold and silver medalists Lu Chen and Surya Bonaly. Her inability to land a clean triple lutz in the long program dropped her off the podium.

In 1998 Markova turned professional and won a silver medal at the World Professional Figure Skating Championships in Jaca, Spain. She has coached and choreographed for Kristina Oblasova and currently coaches Adrian Alvarado. She is an ISU technical specialist for Russia.

== Programs ==
Season	Short program	Free skating
1994–95	Harlem Nocturne by Earle Hagen	Miss Saigon by Claude-Michel Schönberg
1993–94		Space Opera by Didier Marouani

== Results ==
GP: Champions Series (Grand Prix)

International
Event	90–91	91–92	92–93	93–94	94–95	95–96	96–97	97–98
Worlds				10th	5th		12th	
Europeans			12th	3rd	2nd	11th	8th	
GP Final						6th	5th	
GP Skate Canada						4th		6th
GP Cup of Russia							3rd	2nd
GP NHK Trophy						3rd		
GP Nations Cup							4th	
Inter. de Paris			4th					
Nebelhorn Trophy							2nd	
NHK Trophy			7th		5th			
Schäfer Memorial				3rd				
Skate America	7th							
Skate Canada				2nd				
Skate Electric	4th							
National
Russian Champ.			4th	1st	2nd	3rd	2nd	9th
Soviet Champ.		4th						
