= Michael Parsons (figure skater) =

American ice dancer (born 1995)

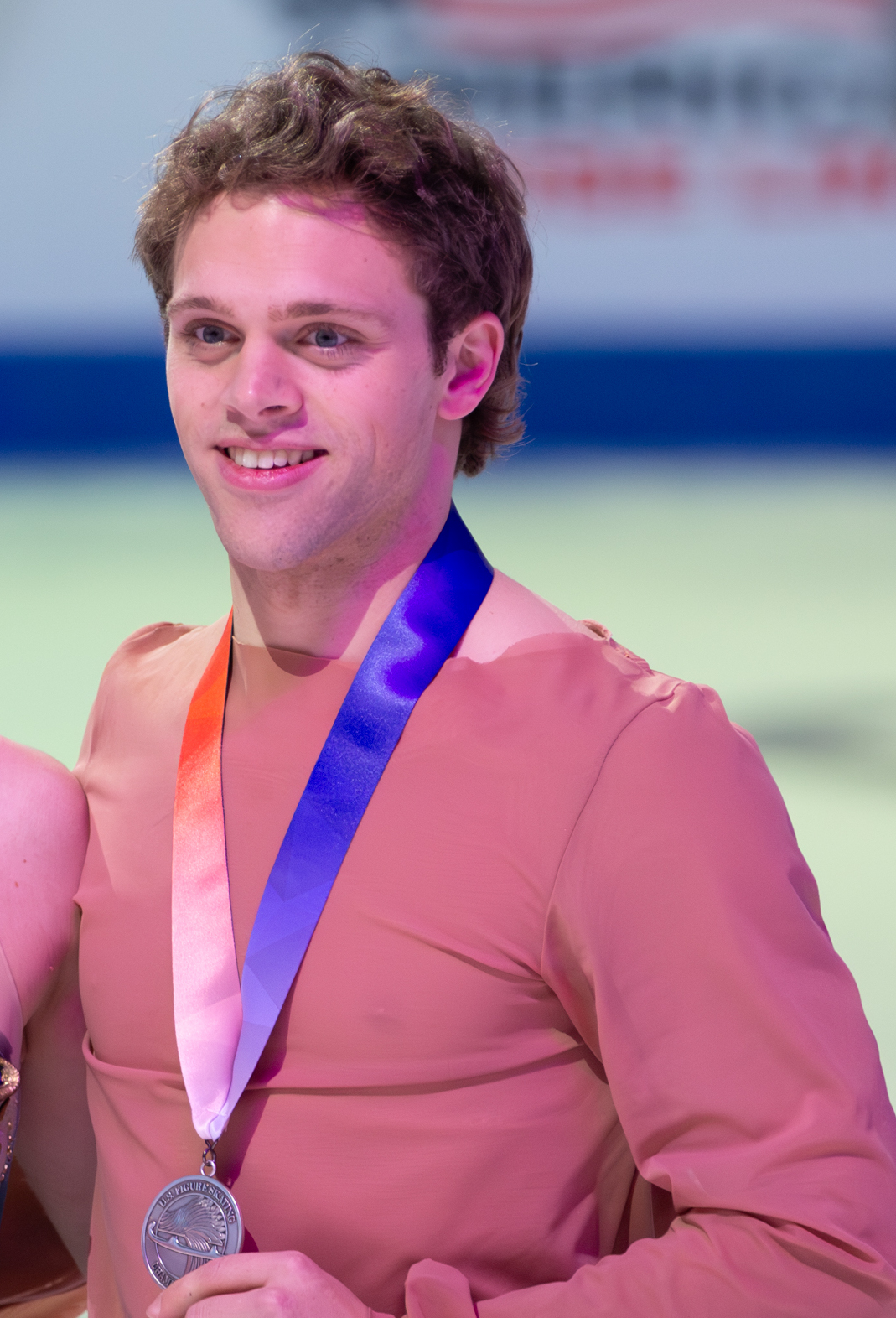
- Michael Parsons during the medal ceremony at the 2026 U.S. Championships

Personal information
- Born: October 3, 1995 (age 31) Wheaton, Maryland, U.S.
- Home town: Derwood, Maryland, U.S.
- Height: 5 ft 8 in (1.72 m)

Figure skating career
- Country: United States
- Discipline: Ice dance
- Partner: Caroline Green (since 2019); Rachel Parsons (2010–19)
- Coach: Charlie White; Tanith White; Greg Zuerlein
- Skating club: Washington Figure Skating Club
- Began skating: 2001

Medal record
Four Continents Championships
Gold medal – first place	2022 Tallinn	Ice dance
Silver medal – second place	2026 Beijing	Ice dance
U.S. Championships
Bronze medal – third place	2025 Wichita	Ice dance
World Junior Championships
Gold medal – first place	2017 Taipei	Ice dance
Silver medal – second place	2016 Debrecen	Ice dance
Junior Grand Prix Final
Gold medal – first place	2016–17 Marseille	Ice dance
Bronze medal – third place	2015–16 Barcelona	Ice dance

Michael Parsons (born October 3, 1995) is an American ice dancer. With his skating partner, Caroline Green, he is a two time Four Continents medalists (gold in 2022 and silver in 2026), a four-time ISU Grand Prix bronze medalist, a seven-time medalist on the ISU Challenger Series, and a six-time U.S. national medalist.

With his sister and former skating partner Rachel Parsons, he is the 2018 NHK Trophy bronze medalist and a four-time silver medalist on the ISU Challenger Series. At the junior level, the Parsons won gold medals at the 2017 World Junior Championships, 2016–17 Junior Grand Prix Final and in the junior event at the 2017 U.S. Championships.

== Personal life ==
Parsons was born October 3, 1995, in Wheaton, Maryland. He has two sisters, Rachel and Katie. He is majoring in biology at Montgomery College not far from Wheaton in Rockville, Maryland, southwest of Baltimore.

== Career ==
=== Partnership with Parsons ===
==== Early years ====
Parsons started learning to skate at age seven to play hockey but ultimately chose figure skating. He joined the Wheaton Ice Skating Academy in December 2003. Early in his ice dancing career, he skated with Kristina Rexford.

He teamed up with his sister, Rachel, in February 2010. They won gold on the novice level at the 2011 U.S. Championships and debuted on the Junior Grand Prix (JGP) series in September 2011, placing 9th in Gdańsk, Poland. After taking the junior pewter medal at the 2012 U.S. Championships, they represented the United States at the 2012 Winter Youth Olympics, placing 4th. They were also selected for the 2012 World Junior Championships in Minsk, Belarus, where they finished 15th.

Competing in the 2012–13 JGP series, the Parsons placed sixth in Linz, Austria before taking bronze in Zagreb, Croatia.

==== 2013–2014 season ====
The Parsons obtained silver at both of their 2013–14 JGP assignments, which took place in Košice, Slovakia and Ostrava, Czech Republic. They qualified for the JGP Final in Fukuoka, Japan where they placed sixth. The duo won bronze at the junior level at the 2014 U.S. Championships and capped off their season with an 8th-place finish at the 2014 World Junior Championships in Sofia, Bulgaria.

==== 2014–2015 season ====
The Parsons medaled at both their 2014–15 JGP assignments, receiving bronze in Aichi, Japan and silver in Zagreb. They finished as the first alternates for the JGP Final and won silver on the junior level at the 2015 U.S. Championships. Concluding their season, they placed fourth at the 2015 World Junior Championships in Tallinn, Estonia.

==== 2015–16 season: World Junior silver and Junior Grand Prix Final bronze ====
During the 2015–16 JGP series, the Parsons were awarded gold in Bratislava, Slovakia and Zagreb. Competing in Barcelona at their second JGP Final, the siblings took the bronze medal behind McNamara/Carpenter and Loboda/Drozd, having placed second in the short dance and fifth in the free. At the 2016 World Junior Championships in Debrecen, Hungary they placed first in the short and second in the free, winning the silver medal behind McNamara/Carpenter.

==== 2016–17 season: Undefeated season, World Junior champion and Junior Grand Prix Final gold ====
Competing in their sixth JGP season, the Parsons were awarded gold in Yokohama, Japan and Dresden, Germany both times ahead of Russia's Shpilevaya/Smirnov. In December 2016, they competed at the JGP Final in Marseille, France; ranked second in the short and first in the free, they won the title by a margin of 0.63 over Loboda/Drozd.

The next month, the Parsons won their first junior national title at the 2017 U.S. Championships, over 11 points clear of the field. The siblings would cap off their undefeated season by winning the 2017 World Junior Championships; similar to the 2016–17 JGP Final, the Parsons won the event overall after placing second in the short and first in the free, earning an even narrower victory of 0.56 ahead of Loboda/Drozd. The Parsons earned personal bests in their combined total and free dance scores on their fifth Junior Championships trip.

==== 2017–18 season: International senior debut ====
Moving to the senior level, the Parsons debuted at the Lake Placid Ice Dance International, winning the silver medal behind longtime rivals McNamara/Carpenter, who were also making their senior debut. They then took the silver medal at the 2017 CS Ondrej Nepela Trophy, their debut on the ISU Challenger series. Assigned to two Grand Prix events, they finished ninth at Skate America and seventh at the Rostelecom Cup. They competed at a second Challenger event, the Golden Spin of Zagreb, where they finished eighth.

Competing at the senior level at the 2018 U.S. Championships, they placed fifth and thus did not qualify for the U.S. Olympic team. Instead they were sent to the 2018 Four Continents Championships, finishing sixth.

==== 2018–19 season: End of Parsons/Parsons ====
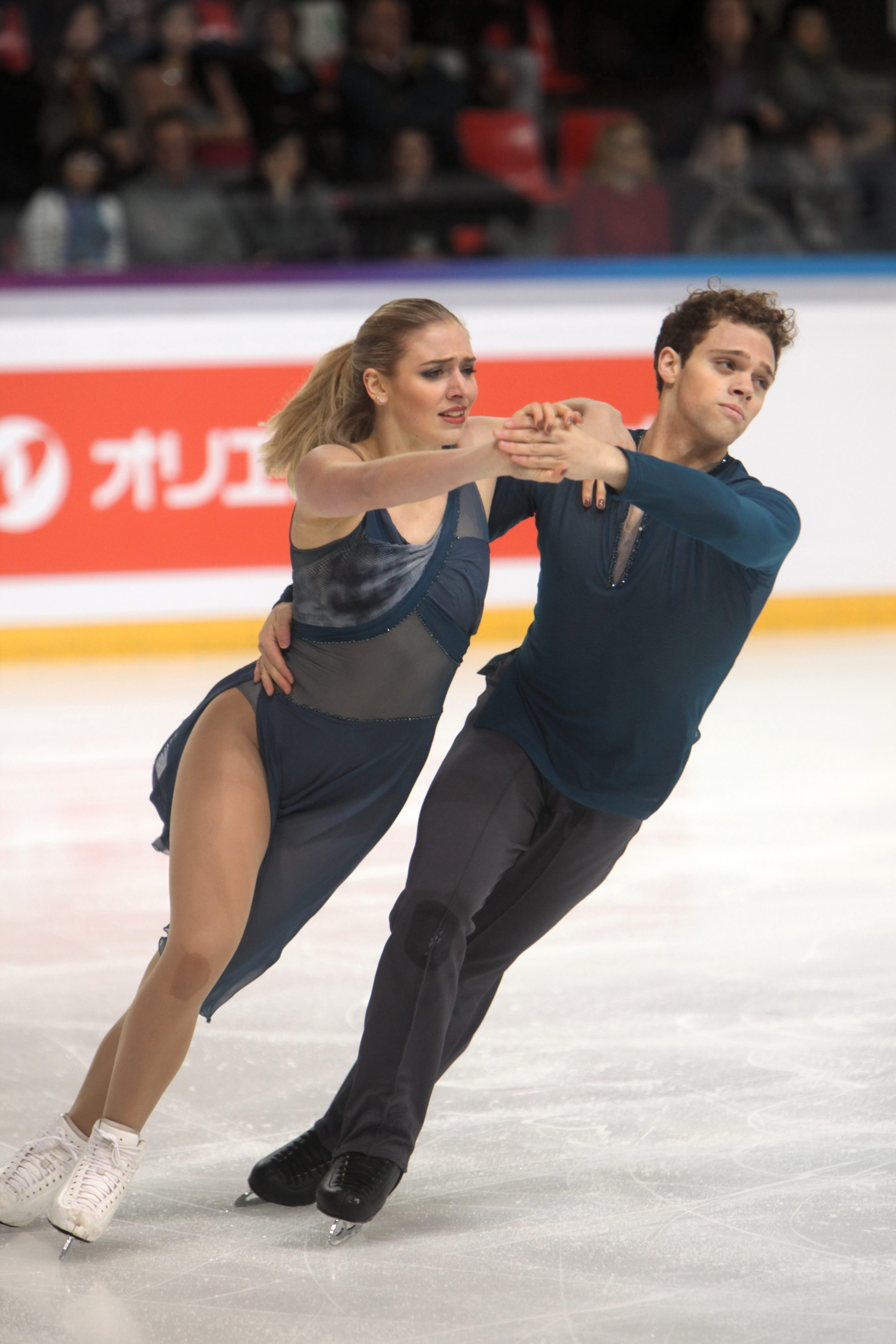
Parsons/Parsons at the 2018 Internationaux de France

"I couldn't be more proud of you, Rach, you're superhuman. It's been an amazing journey, and I've loved sharing it with you. If I know one thing, it's that we haven't seen the last of you ❤️"

— Michael Parsons, April 2, 2019

After a second straight silver medal at Lake Placid's summer ice dance event, the siblings competed in three straight Challenger events, winning consecutive silver medals at the Asian Open, Nebelhorn Trophy and Nepela Trophy. At their first Grand Prix event in Japan, the 2018 NHK Trophy, they won their first and only Grand Prix medal, a bronze. They finished fifth at the 2018 Internationaux de France, their second Grand Prix. The Parsons placed sixth at the 2019 U.S. Championships.

On April 2, 2019, Rachel announced on Instagram that she was retiring from figure skating following a lengthy struggle with an eating disorder. Michael said he intended to continue skating with a new partner.

=== Partnership with Green ===
==== 2019–20 season: Debut of Green/Parsons ====
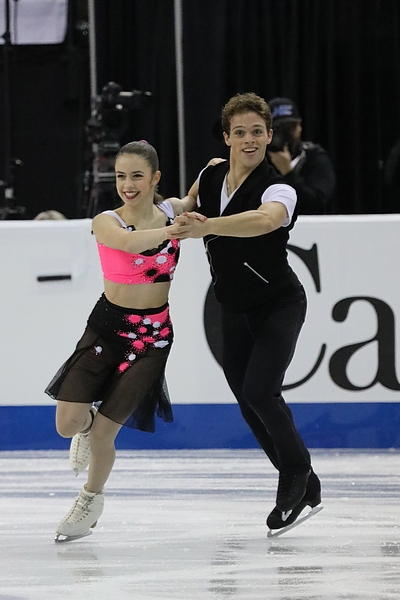
Green/Parsons at the 2019 Skate Canada

On June 20, 2019, it was announced that Parsons had formed a partnership with Caroline Green, the 2019 U.S. junior champion. Green was several years younger than Parsons, an age difference that he said, "on the ice, I really don’t think it matters that much." Green/Parsons placed fifth at Lake Placid Ice Dance International and the 2019 CS Lombardia Trophy. Making their senior Grand Prix debut as a team, they placed seventh at 2019 Skate America. Parsons remarked that "I’m very pleasantly surprised at how well she has adapted to senior. She has done really well, and I couldn’t be happier." Competing the following week at the 2019 Skate Canada International, Green/Parsons again placed seventh. They won their first international medal, a bronze, at the 2019 CS Warsaw Cup behind Lauriault/Le Gac of France and Russia's Konkina/Drozd.

Competing at their first U.S. Championships, Green/Parsons placed fifth in the rhythm dance. They were fifth in the free dance, despite a fall. Parsons said afterward that they were "still a very young team, but it's coming along faster than I ever expected. I couldn't be more proud; I am very happy."

==== 2020–21 season ====
The coronavirus pandemic and resultant lockdowns resulted in Green and Parsons not being able to see or train with each other from March to June. Caroline enlisted her brother Gordon as a training partner at home. In order to limit international travel, the ISU assigned the Grand Prix based on geographic location, and Green/Parsons attended the 2020 Skate America finishing in fourth place.

Green/Parsons went on to finish fourth at the 2021 U.S. Championships, taking the pewter medal.

==== 2021–22 season: Four Continents gold ====
For their free dance, Green, Parsons, and their choreographers opted to design a program in emulation of Martha Graham's style of modern dance, which Parsons characterized as involving "a lot of emotion into almost sparse movements."

Green/Parsons made their Olympic season debut at the 2021 CS Autumn Classic International, winning the bronze medal. Competing next on the Grand Prix at the 2021 Skate Canada International, they finished in fourth place. They were initially assigned to the 2021 Cup of China as their second Grand Prix, but following its cancellation, they were reassigned to the 2021 Gran Premio d'Italia. They placed fourth in the rhythm dance but dropped to fifth place after Green fell exiting a lift in the free dance.

Entering the 2022 U.S. Championships seeking to qualify for the third berth on the American Olympic team, Green/Parsons placed third in the rhythm dance despite a twizzle error, slightly ahead of defending national bronze medalists Hawayek/Baker, who also had a twizzle error. They were fourth in the free dance and dropped behind Hawayek/Baker overall, taking the pewter medal. They were named first alternates for the Olympic team and were sent to compete at the 2022 Four Continents Championships in Tallinn, where they won the gold medal. Parsons reflected on not making the Olympic team, saying, "even while not making the team, we set ourselves up very well for the next four years, and this is a great starting point right here. Not making the team is certainly a motivation."

==== 2022–23 season: First Grand Prix medal and World Championships debut ====
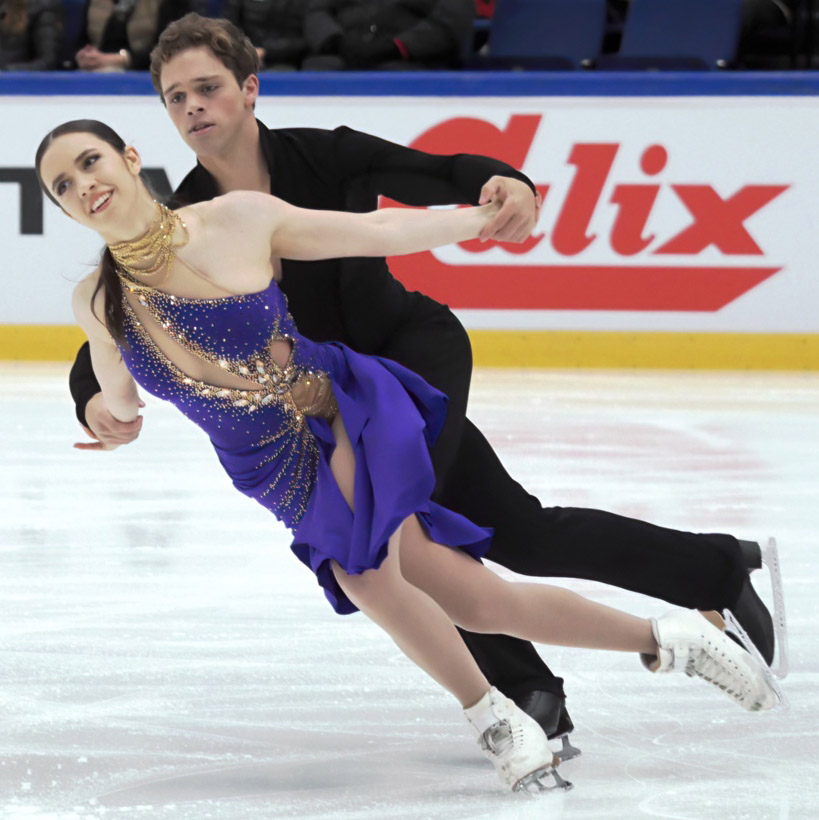
Green/Parsons during their rhythm dance at the 2022 CS Finlandia Trophy

Green and Parsons left their longtime coaches at Wheaton Ice Dance Academy to train at the new Michigan Ice Dance Academy founded by retired Olympic medalists Charlie White and Tanith Belbin. Parsons said of the change, "these next four years are about pushing ourselves as skaters, as artists, and as people."

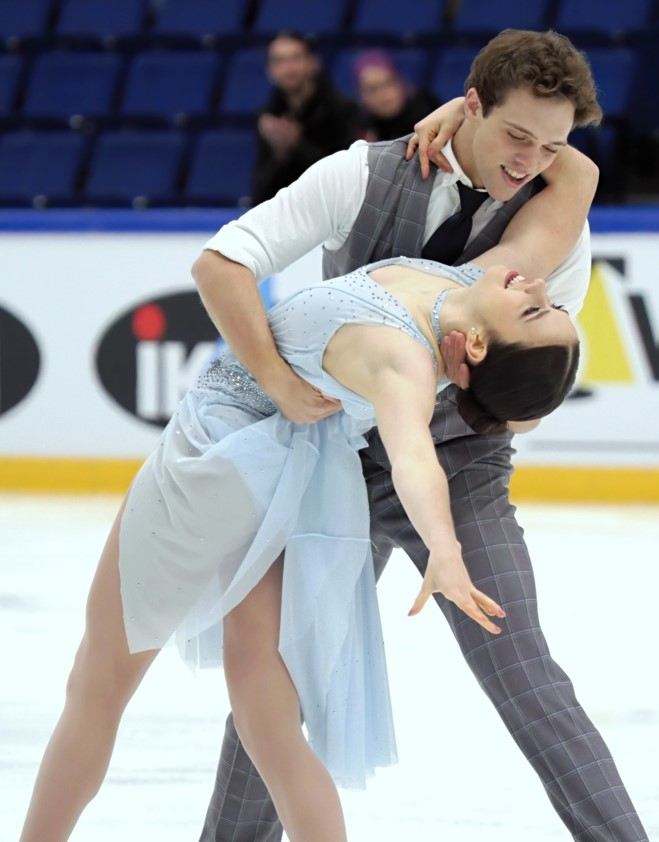
Green/Parsons during their free dance at the 2022 CS Finlandia Trophy

Beginning the season at the 2022 CS Finlandia Trophy, Green/Parsons placed fifth. In their first Grand Prix at the 2022 Skate Canada International, the team placed narrowly third in the rhythm dance but were overtaken in the free dance by Canadians Lajoie/Lagha and finished in fourth place, albeit significantly improving their scores over the Finlandia Trophy. At their second Grand Prix, the 2022 NHK Trophy in Sapporo, they won the bronze medal, their first Grand Prix medal as a partnership and Green's first.

With presumptive national silver medalists Hawayek/Baker missing the 2023 U.S. Championships for health reasons, Green/Parsons entered the event as the favourites for the silver, and finished almost ten points clear of bronze medalists Carreira/Ponomarenko.

Green/Parsons entered the 2023 Four Continents Championships as contenders for the bronze medal, but after Parsons fell in the rhythm dance they placed fifth in that segment, 9.05 points back of Lajoie/Lagha in third. They placed fourth in the free dance, but remained in fifth overall, and finishing behind Carreira/Ponomarenko, who came fourth. Parsons said that they were happy with their performance on the day. They finished sixth in their World Championship debut.

==== 2023–24 season: Second consecutive Grand Prix medal ====
Green/Parsons came sixth at the 2023 CS Lombardia Trophy. Receiving advice from judges there, they opted to discard their original Paula Abdul rhythm dance, switching to a medley of music from Scorpions. Creating the latter program over a period of only a few weeks was "a great learning experience," in the team's view. In its first outing at the 2023 Skate America, they finished fifth in the rhythm dance, and rose to fourth after the free dance. Parsons called the result "a big step towards where we want to be compared to Lombardia Trophy." At their second Grand Prix, the 2023 Cup of China, they placed third in the rhythm dance despite Green losing a twizzle level. Parsons commented that they had "debuted this program at Skate America and at that point it was two weeks old. So now it is four weeks' old and we are happy with progress." Third in the free dance as well, they won their second Grand Prix bronze medal.

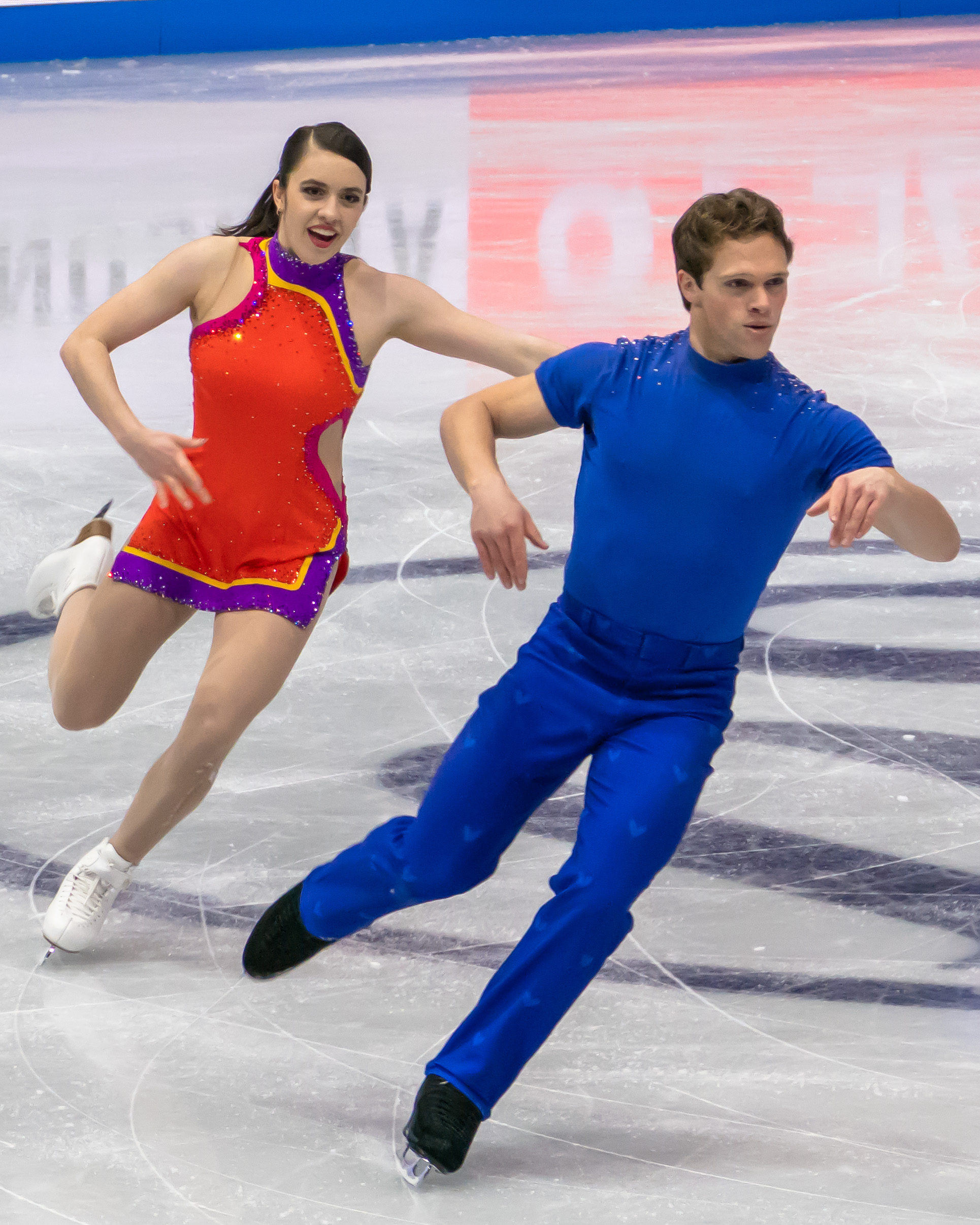
Green and Parsons during their rhythm dance at the 2025 World Championships

In advance of the 2024 U.S. Championships, Green/Parsons were named to the American team for the 2024 Four Continents Championships in Shanghai. They were third in the rhythm dance at the national championships, but multiple errors in the free dance dropped them to fourth place, taking the pewter medal. Parsons deemed it "a disappointing skate." At Four Continents they came fifth in the rhythm dance, and finished sixth overall after a sixth-place free dance. Green said they were "well prepared for a sharp off-season."

==== 2024–25 season ====
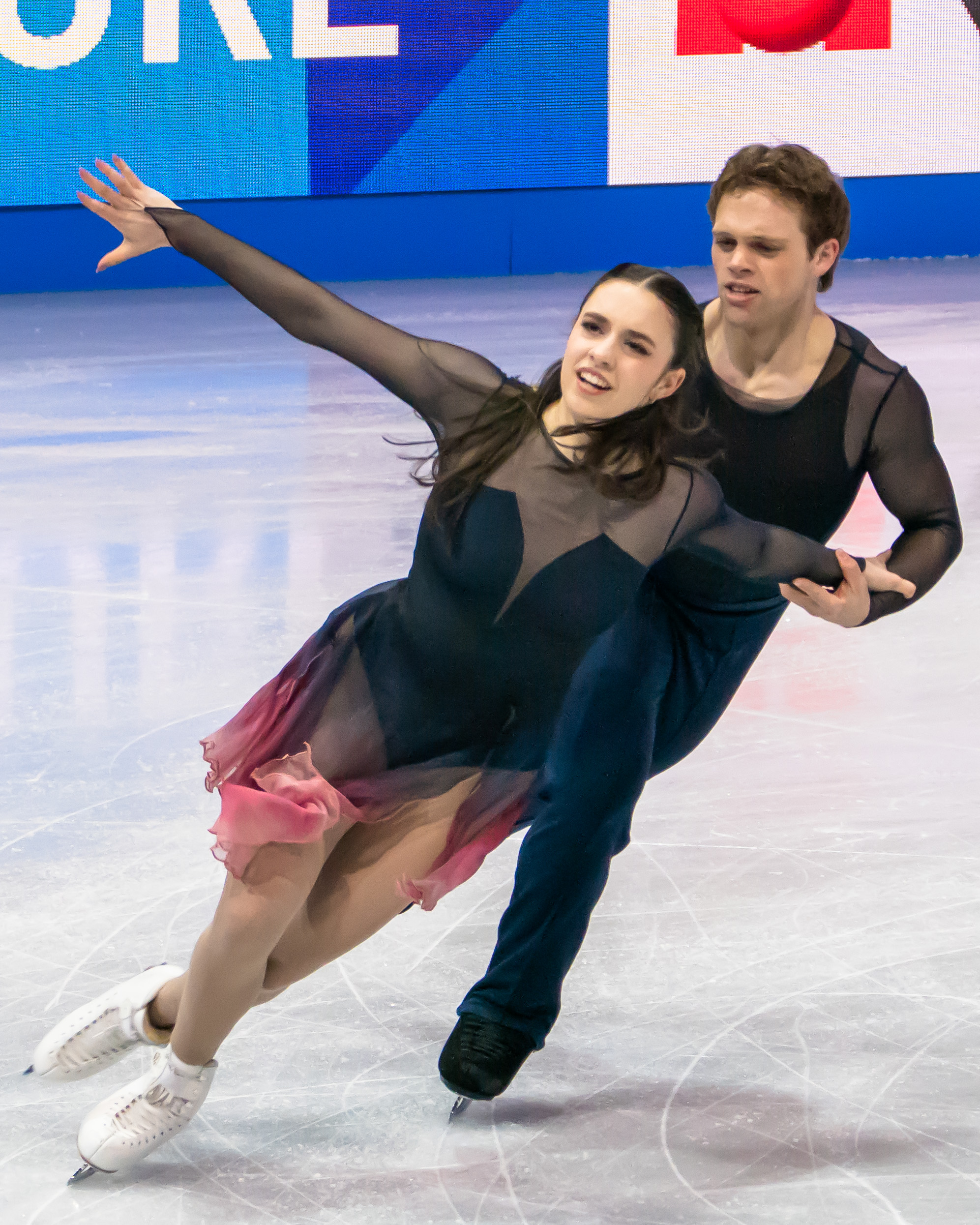
Green and Parsons during their free dance at the 2025 World Championships

Green and Parsons began the season by winning silver at the 2024 Trophée Métropole Nice Côte d'Azur. Going on to compete on the 2024–25 Grand Prix circuit, they finished fourth at the 2024 NHK Trophy. In their second event, they were sixth at the 2024 Cup of China.

At the 2025 U.S. Championships in Wichita, Green/Parsons and Zingas/Kolesnik both received an 82.13 score in the rhythm dance, but as Zingas/Kolesnik had the higher technical score they placed third in the segment, while Green/Parsons were fourth. They rose to third after the free dance, claiming the bronze medal. Parsons revealed that he had been dealing with injuries during the prior season, "so this season started off as a comeback. I no longer think that that's an appropriate term to apply to this season, because we are not coming back anymore. We are better than we have been, and we are going to continue getting better."

Rather than attend the 2025 Four Continents Championships, Green/Parsons were assigned to the Road to 26 Trophy, the test event for the 2026 Winter Olympics in Milan's Forum di Milano. They won the silver medal. Finishing the season at the 2025 World Championships, Green/Parsons placed ninth. He said they "put down two skates we're really proud of," while she added: "Any time we get to skate in front of a crowd like this, we're so incredibly blessed and lucky. And just to have another experience with that type of pressure going into the Olympic season, we're so honored."

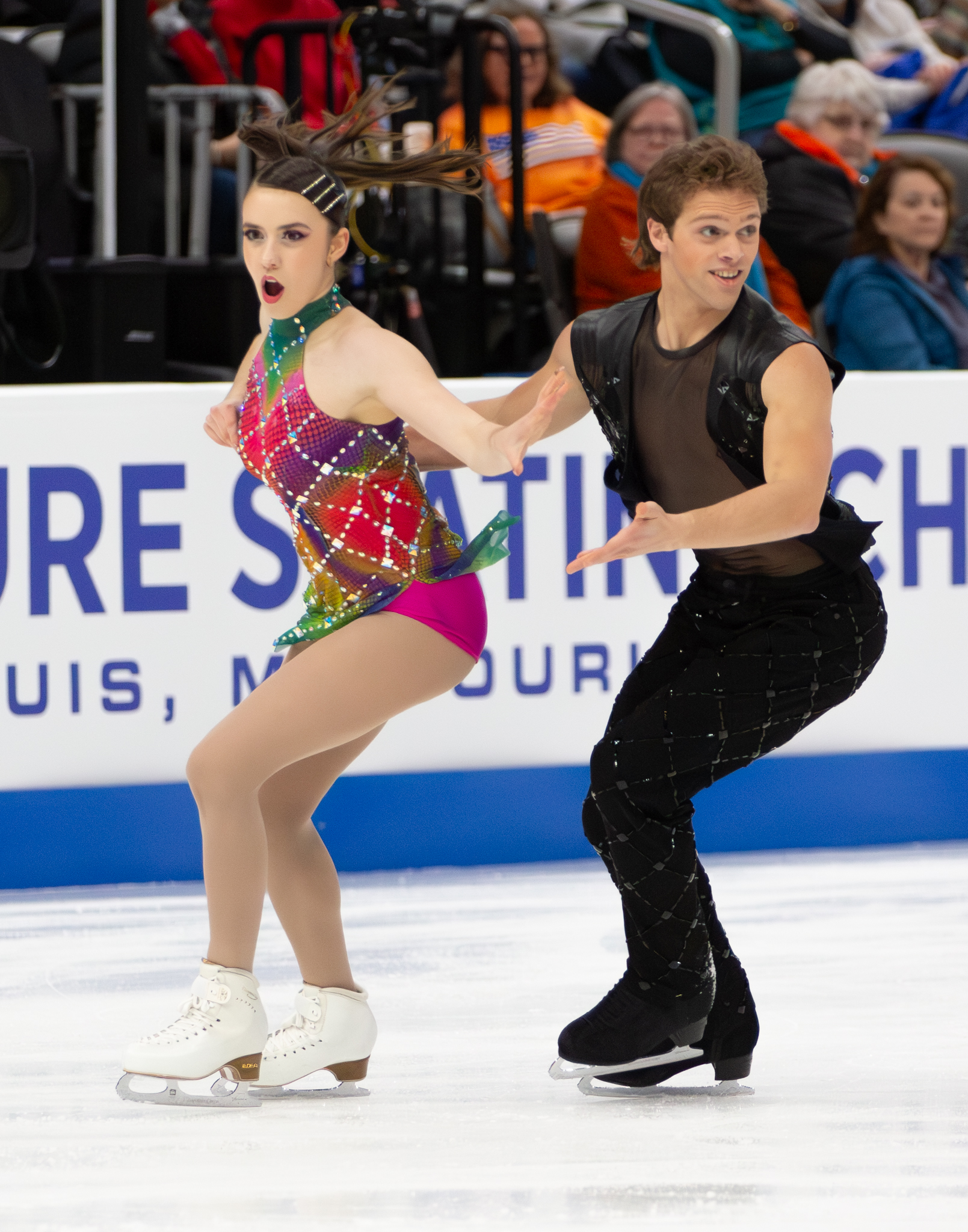
Green and Parsons during their rhythm dance at the 2026 U.S. Championships

==== 2025–26 season: Four Continents silver and Grand Prix medal ====
Green/Parsons opened their season by winning bronze at the 2025 CS Nepela Memorial.

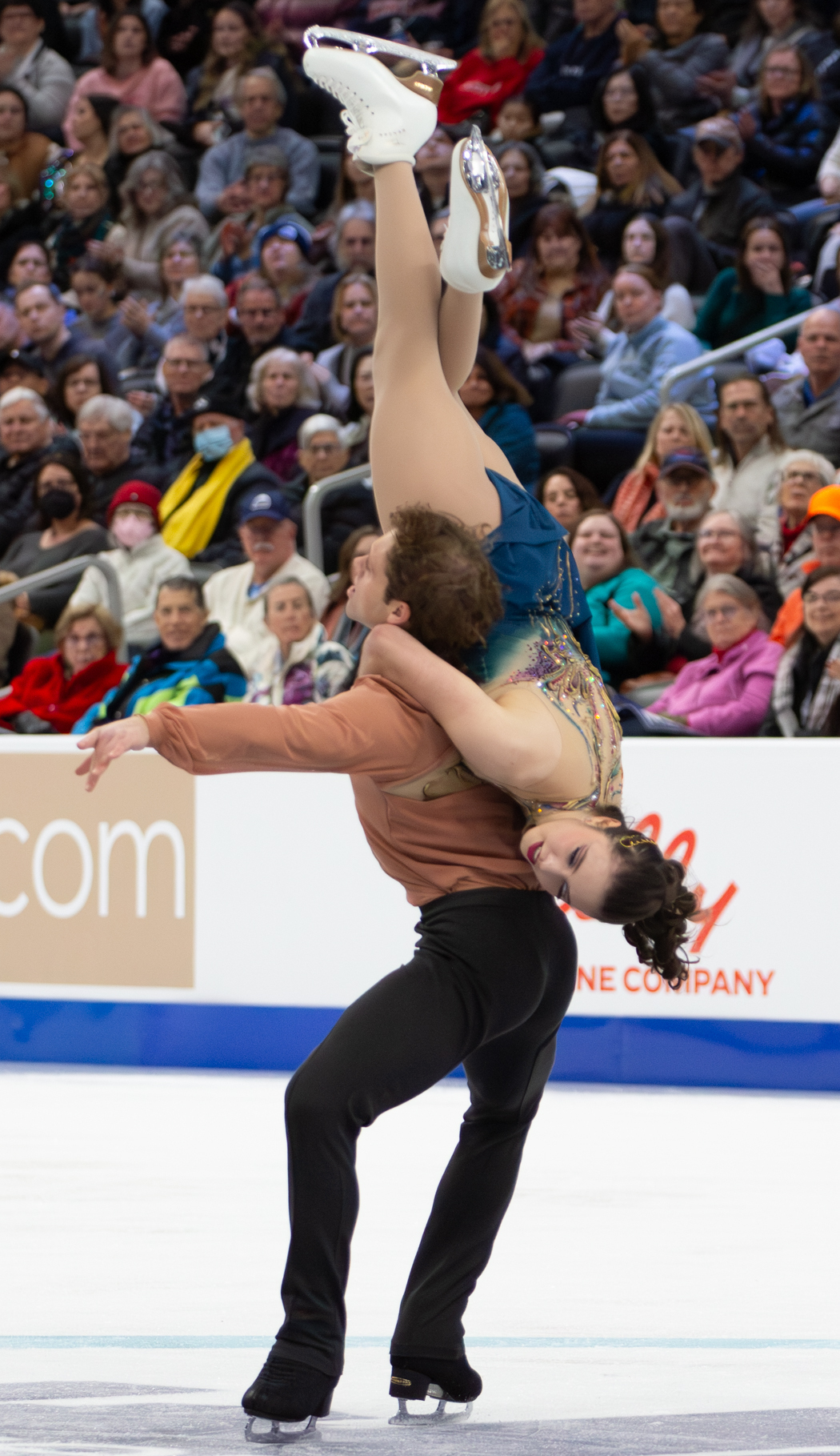
Green and Parsons performing a lift during their free dance at the 2026 U.S. Championships

The following month, they competed at the 2025 Cup of China, but were forced to withdraw before the free dance segment due to Parsons sustaining a pelvic injury during their rhythm dance. "We were giving it our best shot at the practice this morning, giving it a best shot at the warm-up, but at the end of the day, I didn’t feel stable or strong enough to do this program safely with my partner," said Parsons. "It’s really disappointing. I think we both really wanted to get there and show our program to the crowd and everybody watching on TV. But today was not the day to do it, so we’ll say it was time to rest, to recover. We work with the medical team here and look forward to NHK."

In November, the team won the bronze at 2025 NHK Trophy. “I think it’s safe to say that Michael and I have learned a lot in these past three weeks that we’ve been away here in Asia,” said Green. “To go from one of the most difficult experiences of our careers, having to withdraw from the free dance in China, to having the skates that we did here at NHK, has just been really rewarding." They followed this up by winning bronze at the 2025 CS Warsaw Cup.

Two months later, Green/Parsons finished fourth at the 2026 U.S. Championships. They were subsequently named as the first alternates for the 2026 Winter Olympic team and to the 2026 Four Continents team.

Less than two weeks later, Green and Parsons took the silver medal at the 2026 Four Continents Figure Skating Championships. “Every year, every season that we have is different in many ways, and we’ve had some ups and downs since the last Olympic Games,” Parsons summed up. “To be in a very similar position where we’re alternates with the Games and successful at Four Continents, is bittersweet."

Following the withdrawal of Madison Chock and Evan Bates from the 2026 World Championships, Green and Parsons were called up to compete.

==== 2026–27 season: Grand Prix bronze ====
Green/Parsons opened their season by finishing 5th place at the 2026 CS Nepela Memorial. They debuted their Hamilton rhythm dance and tango free dance. After the event, they gave an interview where they expressed satisfaction at their free dance performance to recover after an unfortunate rhythm dance.

In early November, Green/Parsons claimed the bronze medal at 2026 Skate Canada International. “This whole week, I think we showed the work that we’ve been doing at home with our whole team," said Parsons "It was a fight for the whole program, but we stayed together, and it felt like we attacked until the very last step, and that’s all I could ask for.”

Three weeks later, Green/Parsons placed fourth at 2026 Finlandia Trophy. “It was a tough week, but I’m proud of how we stayed together and fought through it,” said Parsons. “Not every competition goes as planned, but we stayed strong. We really relied on each other here, and I think it shows the strength of our partnership.”

== Programs ==
=== Ice dance with Caroline Green ===
Season	Rhythm dance	Free dance	Exhibition
2019–20	Quickstep: Screw Loose (from Cry-Baby) by Adam Schlesinger, David Javerbaum performed by Alli Mauzey; Blues: Baby Baby Baby Baby (from Cry-Baby) by Adam Schlesinger, David Javerbaum performed by James Snyder, Elizabeth Stanley choreo. by Elena Novak, Alexei Kiliakov	Conquest of Spaces; I Love You by Woodkid choreo. by Elena Novak, Alexei Kiliakov	
2020–21	Foxtrot: I Turned the Corner (from Thoroughly Modern Millie) by Gavin Creel & Sutton Foster; Quickstep: What Do I Need With Love (from Thoroughly Modern Millie) by Gavin Creel choreo. by Elena Novak, Alexei Kiliakov	Dance 4 Me; Nothing Compares 2 U; Raspberry Beret by Prince choreo. by Elena Novak, Alexei Kiliakov	
2021–22	My Lovin' (You're Never Gonna Get It) by En Vogue; Rhythm Nation by Janet Jackson choreo. by Elena Novak, Alexei Kiliakov, Jimmie Manners	Violin Concerto No. 1 "EsoConcerto"; Clouds, The Mind on the Wind by Ezio Bosso choreo. by Elena Novak, Alexei Kiliakov	
2022–23	Samba: Vocalizado by Alessandro Olivato; Rhumba: Historia de un Amor performed by Cesária Évora; Samba: Boutique by Watazu choreo. by Charlie White, Tanith White, Greg Zuerlein	Rhapsody in Blue by George Gershwin performed by the Royal Philharmonic Orchestra choreo. by Charlie White, Tanith White, Greg Zuerlein	Singin' in the Rain by Gene Kelly; Yeah! by Usher, ft. Lil Jon and Ludacris
2023–24	Still Loving You; Rock You Like a Hurricane by Scorpions choreo. by Charlie White, Tanith White, Greg Zuerlein, Jaymz Tuaileva; Straight Up by Paula Abdul, Elliot Wolff, & Keith Cohen; Cold Hearted by Paula Abdul & Elliot Wolff choreo. by Charlie White, Tanith White, Greg Zuerlein, Jaymz Tuaileva	Denmark by The Portland Cello Project & Gideon Freudmann; Wind and Snow by Annalisa Tornfelt, Gideon Freudmann, & The Portland Cello Project; Denmark by The Portland Cello Project & Gideon Freudmann choreo. by Charlie White, Tanith White, Greg Zuerlein, Jaymz Tuaileva	Singin' in the Rain by Gene Kelly; Yeah! by Usher, ft. Lil Jon and Ludacris
2024–25	These Boots Are Made for Walkin' (SILO x Martin Wave Remix) by Nancy Sinatra performed by The Supremes & Martin Wave; Soul Bossa Nova by Quincy Jones choreo. by Jean-Luc Baker	Spiegel im Spiegel by Arvo Pärt performed by Angèle Dubeau & La Pietà; Dance Me to the End of Love by Douglas Dare choreo. by Jean-Luc Baker	Sunset Boulevard by Andrew Lloyd Webber; Sunset Boulevard performed by Tom Francis; With One Look performed by Nicole Scherzinger
2025–26	Groove Is in the Heart by Deee-Lite; I'm Too Sexy by Right Said Fred; Groove Is in the Heart (Scotty 2025 Remix) by Deee-Lite choreo. by Krisilyn “Tony” Frazier, Tanith White, Greg Zuerlein, Jean-Luc Baker, Caroline Green, Michael Parsons	Escalate by Tsar B; Son of Nyx by Hozier choreo. by Krisilyn “Tony” Frazier, Tanith White, Greg Zuerlein, Jean-Luc Baker, Caroline Green, Michael Parsons	Sunset Boulevard by Andrew Lloyd Webber; Sunset Boulevard performed by Tom Francis; With One Look performed by Nicole Scherzinger

=== Ice dance with Rachel Parsons ===
Season	Short dance	Free dance	Exhibition
2010–11		The Firebird by Igor Stravinsky	
2011–12	Psychedelic Sally by Eddie Jefferson	To Glory; Enigmatic Soul by Thomas Bergersen	
2012–13	Hip hop: 4 Minutes by Justin Timberlake, Madonna; Blues: Cyber Shanty Town Blues by Christian HipHop Factory; Hip hop: 4 Minutes by Justin Timberlake, Madonna	Faust by Charles Gounod; Walpurgis Night; Three Nymphs	
2013–14	Quickstep, Foxtrot, Quickstep: Funny Girl Overture by Jule Styne	New Moon by Alexandre Desplat; Time Back by Bad Style	
2014–15	Rhumba: Fruta Fresca (Club remix) by Carlos Vives; Samba: Heart of the Wind by Robert Tree Cody	Notre-Dame de Paris by Riccardo Cocciante, Bruno Pelletier	Rhumba; Samba
2015–16	Waltz: Cinderella's Departure for the Ball (from Cinderella) by Sergei Prokofiev	La Malamada; Palabras y Vientoby by Medialuna Tango Project	Elevation by U2
2016–17	Hip hop: A Little Party Never Killed Nobody by Fergie, Q-Tip, GoonRock; Blues: Born to Die by Lana Del Rey; Hip hop	Singing in the Rain arranged by Sophia Sin, Alexander Goldstein	Knockin' on Heaven's Door by Selig; Disco Inferno by The Trammps with McNamara/Carpenter
2017–18	Rhumba: Mambo Molly by Mambo Molly; Slow rhumba: Everybody's Got To Learn Sometime by Zucchero; Mambo: Congo Crazed by Mambo Molly	Ghost Dances; La Partida by Victor Jara; Sikuriadas; Quiaquenpita by Inti Illimani	
	Rhythm dance	Free dance	Exhibition
2018–19	Tango: Vuelvo al Sur by Medialuna Tango Project; Tango: Tango Cha by Sergio Belem	To Build a Home by The Cinematic Orchestra & Patrick Watson; Bohemian Rhapsody by Queen	

== Competitive highlights ==
- GP – Event of the ISU Grand Prix Series
- JGP – Event of the ISU Junior Grand Prix Series
- CS – Event of the ISU Challenger Series
- TBD – Assigned
- WD – Withdrew from competition
- C – Event was cancelled

=== Ice dance with Caroline Green ===
Competition placements at senior level
Season	2019–20	2020–21	2021–22	2022–23	2023–24	2024–25	2025–26	2026–27
World Championships				6th		9th	12th	
Four Continents Championships			1st	5th	6th		2nd	
U.S. Championships	5th	4th	4th	2nd	4th	3rd	4th	
GP Cup of China			C		3rd	6th	WD	
GP Finland								4th
GP Italy			5th					
GP NHK Trophy				3rd		4th	3rd	
GP Skate America	7th	4th			4th			
GP Skate Canada	7th		4th	4th				3rd
CS Autumn Classic			3rd					
CS Denis Ten Memorial								3rd
CS Finlandia Trophy				5th				
CS Golden Spin of Zagreb	3rd							
CS Lombardia Trophy	5th				6th			
CS Nepela Memorial							3rd	5th
CS Trophée Métropole Nice						2nd		
CS Warsaw Cup	3rd		3rd				3rd	
Lake Placid Ice Dance	5th		1st					
Road to 26 Trophy						2nd		

=== Ice dance with Rachel Parsons ===
Competition placements at senior level
Season	2017–18	2018–19
Four Continents Championships	6th	
U.S. Championships	5th	6th
GP France		5th
GP NHK Trophy		3rd
GP Rostelecom Cup	7th	
GP Skate America	9th	
CS Asian Open Trophy		2nd
CS Golden Spin of Zagreb	8th	
CS Lombardia Trophy		2nd
CS Nebelhorn Trophy		2nd
CS Ondrej Nepela Trophy	2nd	
Lake Placid Ice Dance	2nd	2nd

Competition placements at junior level
Season	2011–12	2012–13	2013–14	2014–15	2015–16	2016–17
Winter Youth Olympics	4th					
World Junior Championships	15th		8th	4th	2nd	1st
Junior Grand Prix Final			6th		3rd	1st
U.S. Championships	4th		3rd	2nd	2nd	1st
JGP Austria		6th				
JGP Croatia		3rd		2nd	1st	
JGP Czech Republic			2nd			
JGP Germany						1st
JGP Japan				3rd		1st
JGP Poland	9th					
JGP Slovakia			2nd		1st	
Lake Placid Ice Dance					1st	1st
Toruń Cup				2nd		

== Detailed results ==
=== Ice dance with Caroline Green ===
ISU personal best scores in the +5/-5 GOE System
Segment	Type	Score	Event
Total	TSS	201.44	2023 World Championships
Rhythm dance	TSS	80.62	2022 Four Continents Championships
Rhythm dance	TES	46.66	2022 Four Continents Championships
Rhythm dance	PCS	34.39	2022 Four Continents Championships
Free dance	TSS	122.70	2023 World Championships
Free dance	TES	69.20	2023 World Championships
Free dance	PCS	53.50	2023 World Championships

==== Senior level ====
Results in the 2019–20 season
Date	Event	RD		FD		Total	
Date	Event	P	Score	P	Score	P	Score
Jul 30 – Aug 2, 2019	(United States) 2019 Lake Placid Ice Dance	—N/a	—N/a	—N/a	—N/a	5	—N/a
Sep 13–15, 2019	(Italy) 2019 CS Lombardia Trophy	7	65.11	3	105.42	5	170.53
Oct 18–20, 2019	(United States) 2019 Skate America	8	67.97	7	105.06	7	173.03
Oct 25–27, 2019	2019 Skate Canada International	8	69.00	7	104.82	7	173.82
Nov 14–17, 2019	(Poland) 2019 CS Warsaw Cup	3	67.40	3	104.76	3	172.16
Dec 4–7, 2019	(Croatia) 2019 CS Golden Spin of Zagreb	4	74.18	3	112.92	3	187.10
Jan 20–26, 2020	(United States) 2020 U.S. Championships	5	77.42	5	102.83	5	180.25

Results in the 2020–21 season
Date	Event	RD		FD		Total	
Date	Event	P	Score	P	Score	P	Score
Oct 23–24, 2020	(United States) 2020 Skate America	4	74.98	4	103.07	4	178.05
Jan 11–21, 2021	(United States) 2021 U.S. Championships	4	80.10	4	112.29	4	192.39

Results in the 2021–22 season
Date	Event	RD		FD		Total	
Date	Event	P	Score	P	Score	P	Score
Aug 12–15, 2021	(United States) 2021 Lake Placid Ice Dance	2	65.78	1	109.20	1	174.98
Sep 16–18, 2021	(Canada) 2021 CS Autumn Classic International	3	73.93	3	114.50	3	188.43
Oct 29–31, 2021	2021 Skate Canada International	4	72.40	4	114.11	4	186.51
Nov 5–7, 2021	(Italy) 2021 Gran Premio d'Italia	4	75.60	6	102.66	5	178.26
Nov 17–20, 2021	(Poland) 2021 CS Warsaw Cup	3	75.35	3	112.49	3	187.84
Jan 3–9, 2022	(United States) 2022 U.S. Championships	3	80.85	4	122.42	4	203.27
Jan 18–23, 2022	(Estonia) 2022 Four Continents Championships	1	80.62	1	119.97	1	200.59

Results in the 2022–23 season
Date	Event	RD		FD		Total	
Date	Event	P	Score	P	Score	P	Score
Oct 4–9, 2022	(Finland) 2022 CS Finlandia Trophy	5	72.64	5	104.70	5	177.34
Oct 28–30, 2022	2022 Skate Canada International	3	76.13	4	118.06	4	194.19
Nov 18–20, 2022	(Japan) 2022 NHK Trophy	3	77.00	4	114.10	3	191.10
Jan 23–29, 2023	(United States) 2023 U.S. Championships	2	81.40	2	126.06	2	207.46
Feb 7–12, 2023	(United States) 2023 Four Continents Championships	5	69.99	4	116.89	5	186.88
Mar 22–26, 2023	(Japan) 2023 World Championships	6	78.74	6	122.70	6	201.44

Results in the 2023–24 season
Date	Event	RD		FD		Total	
Date	Event	P	Score	P	Score	P	Score
Sep 8–10, 2023	(Italy) 2023 CS Lombardia Trophy	4	68.44	7	100.12	6	168.56
Oct 20–22, 2023	(United States) 2023 Skate America	5	75.05	4	110.02	4	185.07
Nov 10–12, 2023	2023 Cup of China	3	76.07	3	113.26	3	189.33
Jan 22–28, 2024	(United States) 2024 U.S. Championships	3	80.91	4	112.92	4	193.83
Jan 30 – Feb 4, 2024	(China) 2024 Four Continents Championships	5	75.37	6	115.16	6	190.53

Results in the 2024–25 season
Date	Event	RD		FD		Total	
Date	Event	P	Score	P	Score	P	Score
Oct 16–20, 2024	(France) 2024 CS Trophée Métropole Nice Côte d'Azur	2	73.70	1	112.77	2	186.47
Nov 8–10, 2024	(Japan) 2024 NHK Trophy	4	74.38	4	114.38	4	188.76
Nov 22–24, 2024	2024 Cup of China	6	75.63	6	114.23	6	189.86
Jan 20–26, 2025	(United States) 2025 U.S. Championships	4	82.13	3	123.24	3	205.37
Feb 19–20, 2025	(Italy) 2025 Road to 26 Trophy	2	77.18	2	118.93	2	196.11
Mar 25–30, 2025	(United States) 2025 World Championships	7	77.51	11	114.96	9	192.47

Results in the 2025–26 season
Date	Event	RD		FD		Total	
Date	Event	P	Score	P	Score	P	Score
Sep 25–27, 2025	(Slovakia) 2025 CS Nepela Memorial	7	71.77	2	112.41	3	184.18
Oct 24–26, 2025	2025 Cup of China	7	65.83	–	–	–	WD
Nov 7–9, 2025	(Japan) 2025 NHK Trophy	3	75.14	3	112.76	3	187.90
Nov 19–23, 2025	(Poland) 2025 CS Warsaw Cup	2	79.09	7	110.18	3	189.27
Jan 4–11, 2026	(United States) 2026 U.S. Championships	4	80.55	4	121.50	4	202.05
Jan 21–25, 2026	(China) 2026 Four Continents Championships	2	78.66	3	116.06	2	194.72
Mar 24–29, 2026	(Czech Republic) 2026 World Championships	13	76.42	11	113.56	12	189.98

Results in the 2026–27 season
Date	Event	RD		FD		Total	
Date	Event	P	Score	P	Score	P	Score
Sep 24–27, 2026	(Slovakia) 2026 CS Nepela Memorial	10	68.12	4	110.66	5	178.78
Oct 7–11, 2026	(Kazakhstan) 2026 CS Denis Ten Memorial Challenge	1	78.64	4	101.73	3	180.37
Oct 30 – Nov 1, 2026	2026 Skate Canada International	3	74.24	3	111.78	3	186.02
Nov 20–21, 2026	(Finland) 2026 Finlandia Trophy	5	75.21	4	109.40	4	184.61

=== Ice dance with Rachel Parsons ===
==== Senior level ====
Results in the 2017–18 season
Date	Event	SD		FD		Total	
Date	Event	P	Score	P	Score	P	Score
Jul 28–29, 2017	(United States) 2017 Lake Placid IDI	3	61.25	2	95.57	2	156.82
Sep 21–23, 2017	(Slovakia) 2017 CS Ondrej Nepela Trophy	2	67.48	3	95.66	2	163.14
Oct 20–22, 2017	(Russia) 2017 Rostelecom Cup	7	59.41	8	89.34	7	148.75
Nov 24–26, 2017	(United States) 2017 Skate America	8	58.36	9	87.18	9	145.54
Dec 6–9, 2017	(Croatia) 2017 CS Golden Spin of Zagreb	9	60.18	8	92.20	8	152.38
Dec 29, 2017 – Jan 8, 2018	(United States) 2018 U.S. Championships	5	72.69	6	103.38	5	176.07
Jan 22–28, 2018	(Taiwan) 2018 Four Continents Championships	6	60.18	6	95.12	6	155.30

Results in the 2018–19 season
Date	Event	RD		FD		Total	
Date	Event	P	Score	P	Score	P	Score
Jul 24–27, 2018	(United States) 2018 Lake Placid IDI	2	—N/a	2	—N/a	2	164.74
Aug 1–5, 2018	(Thailand) 2018 CS Asian Open Figure Skating Trophy	1	64.47	3	92.66	2	157.13
Sep 12–16, 2018	(Italy) 2018 CS Lombardia Trophy	2	68.20	3	102.48	2	170.68
Sep 26–29, 2018	(Germany) 2018 CS Nebelhorn Trophy	2	70.02	2	110.93	2	180.95
Nov 9–11, 2018	(Japan) 2018 NHK Trophy	3	69.07	3	109.57	3	178.64
Nov 23–25, 2018	2018 Internationaux de France	6	68.14	6	103.03	5	171.17
Jan 19–27, 2019	(United States) 2019 U.S. Championships	6	72.52	7	97.74	6	170.26

==== Junior level ====
Results in the 2011–12 season
Date	Event	SD		FD		Total	
Date	Event	P	Score	P	Score	P	Score
Sep 14–17, 2011	2011 JGP Poland	10	43.03	9	64.94	9	107.97
Jan 15–17, 2012	(Austria) 2012 Winter Youth Olympics	4	44.69	4	69.53	4	114.22
Jan 22–29, 2012	(United States) 2012 U.S. Championships (Junior)	3	50.80	4	72.46	4	123.26
Feb 27 – Mar 4, 2012	(Belarus) 2012 World Junior Championships	16	45.37	14	63.79	15	109.16

Results in the 2012–13 season
Date	Event	SD		FD		Total	
Date	Event	P	Score	P	Score	P	Score
Sep 12–15, 2012	2012 JGP Austria	4	51.07	8	62.98	6	114.05
Oct 3–6, 2012	2012 JGP Croatia	2	56.35	3	77.74	3	134.09

Results in the 2013–14 season
Date	Event	SD		FD		Total	
Date	Event	P	Score	P	Score	P	Score
Sep 12–15, 2013	2013 JGP Slovakia	2	52.09	2	79.01	2	131.10
Oct 2–5, 2013	2013 JGP Czech Republic	1	59.54	6	75.19	2	134.73
Dec 5–8, 2013	(Japan) 2013–14 Junior Grand Prix Final	6	46.11	6	70.49	6	116.60
Jan 5–12, 2014	(United States) 2014 U.S. Championships (Junior)	3	59.32	2	86.46	3	145.78
Mar 10–16, 2014	(Bulgaria) 2014 World Junior Championships	3	58.65	5	79.88	4	138.53

Results in the 2014–15 season
Date	Event	SD		FD		Total	
Date	Event	P	Score	P	Score	P	Score
Sep 11–14, 2014	2014 JGP Japan	1	55.71	3	75.71	3	131.42
Oct 8–11, 2014	2014 JGP Croatia	2	56.28	2	84.05	2	140.33
Jan 7–10, 2015	(Poland) Mentor Toruń Cup (Junior)	2	58.58	2	84.60	2	143.18
Jan 18–25, 2015	(United States) 2015 U.S. Championships (Junior)	2	60.61	2	84.37	2	144.98
Mar 2–8, 2015	(Estonia) 2015 World Junior Championships	4	58.39	5	82.55	4	140.94

Results in the 2015–16 season
Date	Event	SD		FD		Total	
Date	Event	P	Score	P	Score	P	Score
Jul 27–30, 2015	(United States) 2015 Lake Placid IDI (Junior)	1		1		1	141.41
Aug 19–22, 2015	2015 JGP Slovakia	2	59.02	1	90.40	1	149.42
Oct 7–10, 2015	2015 JGP Croatia	1	66.49	1	94.30	1	160.79
Dec 9–13, 2015	(Spain) 2015–16 Junior Grand Prix Final	2	64.91	5	79.50	3	144.41
Jan 15–24, 2016	(United States) 2016 U.S. Championships (Junior)	2	70.29	2	95.17	2	165.46
Mar 14–20, 2016	(Hungary) 2016 World Junior Championships	1	67.88	2	94.86	2	162.74

Results in the 2016–17 season
Date	Event	SD		FD		Total	
Date	Event	P	Score	P	Score	P	Score
Jul 27–30, 2016	(United States) 2016 Lake Placid IDI (Junior)	1	66.15	1	90.02	1	156.17
Sep 8–11, 2016	2016 JGP Japan	1	66.76	1	93.66	1	160.42
Oct 5–8, 2016	2016 JGP Germany	1	65.93	1	91.70	1	157.63
Dec 7–11, 2016	(France) 2016–17 Junior Grand Prix Final	2	66.91	1	95.59	1	162.50
Jan 14–22, 2017	(United States) 2017 U.S. Championships (Junior)	1	72.42	1	103.91	1	176.33
Mar 15–19, 2017	(Taiwan) 2017 World Junior Championships	2	67.29	1	97.54	1	164.83
