= 2011 UK Music Video Awards =

- Date: 8 November 2011
- Location: Leicester Square, London
- Hosted by: Adam Buxton
- Website: www.ukmva.com

The 2011 UK Music Video Awards were held on 8 November 2011 at the Odeon West End in Leicester Square, London to recognise the best in music videos and music film making from United Kingdom and worldwide. The nominations were announced on 12 October 2011. The winners are highlighted in bold in the list below.

== Video of the Year ==
Video of the Year
- **Manchester Orchestra – "Simple Math"**
  **(Directors: Daniels)**

== Special awards ==
The Icon Award	Outstanding Achievement Award
**Barry Wasserman**	**Jonas Åkerlund**

== Video Genre Categories ==
Best Pop Video - UK	Best Pop Video - International
**Adele - "Rolling in the Deep"** **(Director: Sam Brown)**: Bruno Mars - "Lazy Song"; Jessie J - "Do It like a Dude"; Kylie Minogue - "Get Outta My Way"; Mark Ronson feat. Boy George - "Somebody to Love Me"; Scissor Sisters - "Invisible Light"	**Oh Land - "White Nights"** **(Director: CANADA)**: Cassius - "I <3 U So"; Justice - "Civilization"; Karl X Johan - "Flames"; Robyn - "Call Your Girlfriend"; Woodkid - "Iron"
Best Dance Video - UK	Best Dance Video - International
**Chase & Status ft. Liam Bailey - "Blind Faith"** **(Director: Daniel Wolfe)**: Calvin Harris feat. Kelis - "Bounce"; Grum - "Through the Night"; J Majik & Wickaman feat. Dee Freer - "In Pieces"; Japanese Popstars - "Let Go"; Magnetic Man feat. John Legend - "Getting Nowhere"	**Duck Sauce - "Barbra Streisand"** **(Director: So Me)**: !!! - "Jamie, My Intentions Are Bass"; B Fleischmann - "Playtime"; Bag Raiders - "Sunlight"; Bonjay - "Stumble"; Wolfgang Gartner - "Illmerica"
Best Urban Video - UK	Best Urban Video - International
**Wiley - "Numbers in Action"** **(Director: Us)**: Chase & Status feat. Tinie Tempah - "Hitz"; Ed Sheeran - "You Need Me, I Don't Need You"; Tinie Tempah feat. Ellie Goulding - "Wonderman"; Tricky - "Murder Weapon"; Wretch 32 - "Traktor"	**Jay-Z & Kanye West - "Otis"** **(Director: Spike Jonze)**: Beastie Boys feat. Santigold - "Don't Play No Game That I Can't Win"; Eminem feat. Rihanna - "Love the Way You Lie"; Raphael Saadiq - "Good Man"; Thunderclaps - "Judgement Day "Todor & Petru"
Best Indie/Rock Video - UK	Best Indie/Rock Video - International
**Is Tropical - "The Greeks"** **(Directors: Megaforce)**: Battles - "Ice Cream"; Foals - "Blue Blood"; Little Comets - "The Isles"; Metronomy - "The Bay"; The Shoes - "Stay the Same"	**Manchester Orchestra – "Simple Math"** **(Directors: Daniels)**: El Guincho - "Bombay"; No Age - "Fever Dreaming"; The Black Keys - "Howlin' for You"; The Good The Bad - "030"; WhoMadeWho - "Every Minute Alone"
Best Alternative Video - UK	Best Alternative Video - International
**Depeche Mode - "Personal Jesus (Stargate remix)"** **(Directors: Patrick Daughters)**: James Blake - "Lindisfarne"; Klaxons - "Twin Flames"; Tom Vek - "Aroused"; Tyler the Creator - "Yonkers"; Yeasayer - "Madder Red"	**Arcade Fire - "The Suburbs"** **(Director: Spike Jonze)**: MGMT - "Congratulations"; OK Go - "All Is Not Lost"; OK Go - "White Knuckles"; Röyksopp - "Senior Living"; Spoek Mathambo - "Control"
Best Pop Video - Budget	Best Dance Video - Budget
**Cool Fun - "House"** **(Director: Prano Bailey-Bond)**: Alex Clare - "Relax My Beloved"; Clean Bandit - "Telephone Banking"; Duran Duran - "Before The Rain"; Josh Radin - "I Missed You"; Sébastien Tellier - "Look"	**Eskmo - "We Got More"** **(Director: Cyriak Harris)**: Clean Bandit - "Mozart's House"; Craze Hoax - "Wait for Me"; Etienne de Crecy - "No Brain"; Jaymo and Andy George feat. J2k - "Hold Me Back"; Loose Fit - "Table Beggar"
Best Urban Video - Budget	Best Indie/Rock Video - Budget
**Jargon VA ft. Tinie Tempah - "Disappoint You"** **(Director: Ian Pons Jewell)**: Dels - "Trumpalump"; Dels feat. Roots Manuva & Joe Goddard - "Capsize"; Ghostpoet - "Survive It"; Riz MC - "Get On It"; Skillit feat. T.B. & K-Nite 13 - "The Truth"	**Memory Tapes - "Yes I Know"** **(Directors: Eric Epstein)**: Fulton Lights - "Staring Out The Window"; Hollerado - "Americanarama"; Keaton Henson - "Charon"; Lasse Passage - "Say Say Say"; Maps & Atlases - "Israeli Caves"
Best Alternative Video - Budget
**Matta - "Release The Freq"** **(Director: Kim Holm)**: Esben & The Witch - "Marching Song"; Ghostpoet - "Liiines"; Hauschka - "Children"; King Creosote & Jon Hopkins - "Bubble"; U.N.K.L.E. - "Runaway Pointman re-edit"

== Craft and Technical Categories ==
Best Animation in a Video	Best Art Direction & Design in a Video
**Is Tropical - "The Greeks"** **(Animators: Seven)**: Clinic - "Bubblegum"; Eskmo - "We Got More"; Flying Lotus - "Kill Your Co-Workers"; King Creosote & Jon Hopkins - "Bubble"; Massive Attack - "Atlas Air"	**Scissor Sisters - "Invisible Light"** **(Art Director: Roger Bellés)**: Adele - "Rolling in the Deep"; Chase & Status feat. Liam Bailey - Blind Faith; Justice - "Civilization"; Oh Land - "White Nights"; Plan B - "The Recluse"
Best Cinematography in a Video	Best Editing in a Video
**Adele - "Rolling in the Deep"** **(DOP: Tom Townend)**: Battles - "Ice Cream"; Calvin Harris - "Feel So Close"; Chapel Club - "Surfacing"; J Majik & Wickaman feat. Dee Freer - "In Pieces"; Jessie J - "Do It Like a Dude"	**Tom Vek - "Aroused"** **(Editor: Tom Townend)**: Battles - "Ice Cream"; Ed Sheeran - "You Need Me, I Don't Need You"; Little Comets - "The Isles"; Metronomy - "The Bay"; The Subways - "We Don't Need Money To Have a Good Time"
Best Styling in a Video	Best Telecine in a Video
**Chase & Status feat. Liam Bailey - "Blind Faith"** **(Stylist: Hannah Edwards)**: Alpines - "Cocoon"; Oh Land - "White Nights"; Paloma Faith - "Smoke and Mirrors"; Scissor Sisters - "Invisible Light"; Woodkid - "Iron"	**Plan B - "Love Goes Down"** **(TK: Simon Bourne)**: DJ Fresh - "Louder"; Kylie Minogue - "Get Outta My Way"; Liam Bailey - "It's Not The Same"; Metronomy - "The Bay"; Plan B - "The Recluse"
Best Visual Effects in a Video	Best Choreography in a Video
**Klaxons - "Twin Flames"** **(VFX: Ric Comline)**: Danger Mouse, Daniele Luppi, Norah Jones - Black "3 Dreams of Black"; Justice - "Civilization"; Massive Attack - "Atlas Air"; Memory Tapes - "Yes I Know"; Woodkid - "Iron"	**Wave Machines - "Keep The Light On"** **(Choreographer: Jen Irons)**: Darwin Deez - "DNA"; Radiohead - "Lotus Flower"; SebastiAn - "Embody"; Two Door Cinema Club - "What You Know"; Wiley - "Numbers in Action"
Best Live Music Coverage	Best Music Advertisement - Television or Online
**Tinie Tempah - "Ibiza Rocks"** **(Directors: Syndrome)**: Faithless - "Passing The Baton"; Jessie J - Live In London; Kylie Minogue - Aphrodite Les Folies tour in 3D; Richard Ashcroft - Live at Shepherds Bush Empire; Various - Live From Abbey Road	**Mark Ronson & The Business International - "Record Collection"** **(Directors: Steve Milbourne, Phil Clandillon)**: BBC 6Music - "Building"; Fenech Soler - "Minotaur (album launch viral)"; Ministry of Sound - "Electronic 80s ll"; Plan B - "The Defamation of Strickland Banks"; Tinie Tempah - "Disc-Overy"
The Innovation Award	The People's Choice Award
**The Shoes - "Cover Your Eyes"** **(Directors: We Are From L.A.)**: Danger Mouse, Daniele Luppi, Norah Jones - Black "3 Dreams of Black"; Arcade Fire - We Used To Wait "The Wilderness Downtown"; OK Go - "All Is Not Lost"; Professor Green with Doritos - "Coming To Get Me (360° interactive video)"; White Lies - "Strangers web video"	**JLS ft. Tinie Tempah - "Eyes Wide Shut"** (Director: Paul Caslin)

== Individual and Company Categories ==
Best Director	Best New Director
**CANADA**	**Us**
Best Producer	Best Commissioner
**Tim Francis**: Leanne Stott; Liz Kessler; Sarah Tognazzi; Tamsin Glasson; Tom Berendsen	**Ross Anderson**
