= 2012 UK Music Video Awards =

- Date: 8 November 2012
- Location: Leicester Square, London
- Hosted by: Adam Buxton
- Website: www.ukmva.com

The 2012 UK Music Video Awards were held on 8 November 2012 at the Odeon West End in Leicester Square, London to recognise the best in music videos and music film making from United Kingdom and worldwide. The nominations were announced on 8 October 2012. English rapper M.I.A. won Video of the Year for "Bad Girls" directed by Romain Gavras, the winners are highlighted in bold in the list below.

== Video of the Year ==
Video of the Year
- **M.I.A. – "Bad Girls"**
  **(Director: Romain Gavras)**

== Special awards ==
| Icon Award | Outstanding Contribution |
|---|---|
| **Jamie Thraves** | **David Knight** |

== Video Genre Categories ==
| Best Pop Video - UK | Best Pop Video - International |
|---|---|
| **M.I.A. - "Bad Girls"** **(Director: Romain Gavras)**: Calvin Harris feat. Ne-Yo - "Let's Go"; Ed Sheeran - "Lego House"; George Michael - "White Light"; Paloma Faith - "Picking Up the Pieces"; Will Young - "Losing Myself" | **Lana Del Rey - "Blue Jeans"** **(Director: Yoann Lemoine)**: Justice - "On 'n On"; Lana Del Rey - "Born to Die"; Lana Del Rey - "National Anthem"; Maïa Vidal - "Follow Me"; Rihanna feat. Calvin Harris - "We Found Love" |
| Best Dance Video - UK | Best Dance Video - International |
| **The Shoes - "Time to Dance"** **(Director: Daniel Wolfe)**: Benga - "I Will Never Change"; Bonobo - "Eyesdown Machinedrum Remix"; David Guetta feat. Sia - "Titanium"; Hot Chip - "Night and Day"; Rudimental - "Feel the Love" | **Duck Sauce - "Big Bad Wolf"** **(Director: Keith Schofield)**: Flight Facilities - "Foreign Language"; Justice - "Audio Video Disco"; Justice - "New Lands"; Moonbootica - "Iconic"; Skrillex - "First of the Year (Equinox)" |
| Best Urban Video - UK | Best Urban Video - International |
| **Plan B - "Ill Manors"** **(Director: Yann Demange)**: Delilah - "Inside My Love"; Devlin feat. Ed Sheeran - "Watchtower"; DJ Shadow feat. Afrikan Boy - "I'm Excited"; Labrinth - "Express Yourself"; Rita Ora feat. Tinie Tempah - "R.I.P." | **Frank Ocean - "Novacane"** **(Director: Nabil)**: Blu feat. U-God - "Doinnothin"; Casey Veggies - "Euphoria III"; Kanye West & Jay-Z - "Ni**as in Paris"; Jay-Z & Kanye West - "No Church in the Wild"; The Cool Kids - "Rush Hour Traffic" |
| Best Indie/Rock Video - UK | Best Indie/Rock Video - International |
| **Spiritualized - "Hey Jane"** **(Director: AG Rojas)**: Alt-J - "Tessellate"; Band of Skulls - "Sweet Sour"; Clock Opera - "Lesson No 7"; Coldplay - "Paradise (alternative version)"; The Kooks - "Saboteur" | **The Shins - "Simple Song"** **(Director: Daniels)**: Cults - "Go Outside"; Foster the People - "Houdini"; Jack White - "Sixteen Saltines"; Tenacious D - "Rize of the Fenix"; Woodkid - "Run Boy Run" |
| Best Alternative Video - UK | Best Alternative Video - International |
| **Alt-J - "Breezeblocks"** **(Director: Ellis Bahl)**: Antony & The Johnsons - "Cut the World"; Clark - "Black Stone"; Moones - "Better Energy"; James Blake - "A Case of You"; Keaton Henson - "Small Hands" | **The Hickey Underworld - "The Frog"** **(Director: Joe Vanhoutteghem)**: DangerMouse & Daniele Luppi, feat. Jack White - "Two Against One"; Feist - "The Bad In Each Other"; Grimes - "Oblivion"; M83 - "Midnight City"; St. Vincent - "Cheerleader" |
| Best Pop Video - Budget | Best Dance Video - Budget |
| **Rent Boys - "Shoot The Shot"** **(Director: Zac Ella)**: EJ - "Mama I'm Going To Sing"; Igor Volk - "Voices"; Laurel Collective - "Jelly Bird"; Louise Golbey - "How It Is"; Sébastien Tellier - "Cochon Ville" | **Todd Terje - "Inspector Norse"** **(Director: Kristoffer Borgli)**: DELTΔ HEΔVY - "Get By"; DELTΔ HEΔVY - "Hold Me"; Disclosure ft. Ria Ritchie - "Control"; Kidnap Kid - "Vehl"; Toby Gale - "Showdown" |
| Best Urban Video - Budget | Best Indie/Rock Video - Budget |
| **Noisses ft. RTKAL, Lady Leshurr and Foreign Beggars - "Run Your Mouth"** **(Director: Drew Cox)**: A$AP Rocky - "Peso"; Astroid Boys - "Bad Ass"; Dubbul O - "Spooky Caravan"; James Brown - "It's a Man's Man's Man's World"; Pato Siebenhaar - "Ga For Det" | **When Saints Go Machine - "Parix"** **(Director: Daniel-Kragh Jacobsen)**: Bombay Bicycle Club - "Lights Out, Words Gone"; Graham Coxon - "What It'll Take"; Here We Go Magic - "How Do I Know"; Piers Faccini - "Tribe"; We Cut Corners - "Pirates Life" |
Best Alternative Video - Budget
**The Death Set - "They Come to Get Us"** **(Director: Guillaume Panariello)**: C2C - "Down the Road"; Factory Floor - "On Hold"; Hilary Hahn/Hauschka - "Draw a Map"; Rudi Zygaldo - "Melpomene"; Three Trapped Tigers - "Reset"

=== Technical ===
| Best Animation in a Video | Best Art Direction & Design in a Video |
|---|---|
| **Fleet Foxes - "The Shrine/An Argument"** **(Animators: Sean Pecknold & Britta Johnson)**: DangerMouse & Daniele Luppi, ft. Jack White - "Two Against One"; DELTΔ HEΔVY - "Get By"; Gorillaz - "DoYaThing"; Kina - "In Your Arms"; Moones - "Better Energy" | **Justice - "New Lands"** **(Art Director: Roger Bellés)**: Duck Sauce - "Big Bad Wolf"; Keaton Henson - "Small Hands"; M.I.A. - "Bad Girls"; The Maccabees - "Pelican"; The Shoes - "Time to Dance" |
| Best Cinematography in a Video | Best Choreography in a Video |
| **Feist - "The Bad In Each Other"** **(DoP: Kasper Tuxen)**: James Blake - "A Case Of You"; Jay-Z & Kanye West - "No Church in the Wild"; Lana Del Rey - "Blue Jeans"; M.I.A. - "Bad Girls"; UNKLE - "Another Night Out" | **Will Young - "Losing Myself"** **(Choreographer: Aletta Collins)**: Avicii - "Levels"; Delilah - "Inside My Love"; Hauschka - "Radar"; Thunderbird Gerard - "Thunderbird"; Toby Gale - "Showdown" |
| Best Editing in a Video | Best Styling in a Video |
| **The Shoes - "Time to Dance"** **(Editor: Tom Lindsay)**: Florence and The Machine - "Shake It Out"; Justice - "New Lands"; M.I.A. - "Bad Girls"; Plan B - "Ill Manors"; UNKLE - "Another Night Out" | **M.I.A. - "Bad Girls"** **(Stylist: Hannah Edwards)**: Duran Duran - "Girl Panic"; Flight Facilities - "Foreign Language"; Lana Del Rey - "National Anthem"; MADEMOISELLE YULIA - "Gimme Gimme"; Rammstein - "Mein Land" |
| Best Telecine in a Video | Best Visual Effects in a Video |
| **Temper Trap - "Trembling Hands"** **(TK: James Tillett at Moving Picture Company)**: James Blake - "A Case Of You"; Justice - "New Lands"; Jay-Z & Kanye West - "No Church in the Wild"; The Shoes - "Time to Dance"; Will Young - "Losing Myself" | **Woodkid - "Run Boy Run"** **(VFX: One More Productions)**: Duck Sauce - "Big Bad Wolf"; Friendly Fires - "Hurting"; Foster the People - "Houdini"; Hot Chip - "Night and Day"; Justice - "New Lands" |

=== Music Vision and Innovation ===
| Best Live Music Coverage | Best Music AD - TV or Online |
|---|---|
| **Chemical Brothers - "Don't Think"** **(Director: Adam Smith)** **LCD Soundsystem - "Shut Up and Play the Hits"** **(Director: Thirtytwo)**: Chase & Status - "Live At Brixton Academy"; Rizzle Kicks - "Live and Typical"; The Maccabees - "VEVO presents: The Maccabees (In The Dark)"; Various Artists - "The Jo Whiley Music Show" | **Kasabian - "Velociraptor!"** **(Directors: John Paveley, The Lennox Brothers & Ian Dutt)**: The Killers - "Battle Born"; Olly Murs - "Olly Murs"; Pink Floyd - "A Foot In The Dark"; Stavanger Symphony Orchestra - "Seven Vibes"; Soulwax - "Radio Soulwax "Machine"" |
| The Innovation Award | People's Choice Award |
| **ALB - "Golden Chains"** **(Director: Johnatan Broda)**: Ghostpoet & The D.O.T. - "Trouble"; j.viewz - "Rivers and Homes"; The Maccabees - "VEVO presents: The Maccabees (In The Dark)"; Madness - "Our House at The Queen's Diamond Jubilee"; Various Artists - "Alternative Advent Calendar" | **One Direction - "Live While We're Young"** **(Director: Vaughan Arnell)** |

=== Individual ===
| Best Producer | Best Commissioner |
|---|---|
| **Lee Groombridge**: Gareth Thomas; Leanne Stott; Liz Kessler; Phil Tidy; Tamsin Glasson | **John Moule**: Dan Millar; Dan Curwin; James Hackett; Julia Frost; Mike O'Keefe |
| Best Director | Best New Director |
| **Romain Gavras** | **AG Rojas** |
