= The Divergent Series: Insurgent (soundtrack) =

The Divergent Series: Insurgent – Original Motion Picture Soundtrack

Soundtrack album by Various artists
- Released: March 17, 2015
- Recorded: Various times
- Genres: Alternative rock; indie pop; electronic; industrial
- Length: 32:14
- Label: Interscope
- Producers: Joseph Trapanese (composer); Randall Poster (music supervisor)

Singles from The Divergent Series: Insurgent – Original Motion Picture Soundtrack
- 1. "Warriors" Released: September 18, 2014; 2. "Holes in the Sky" Released: March 2, 2015; 3. "Never Let You Down" Released: March 9, 2015

The Divergent Series: Insurgent – Original Motion Picture Soundtrack is the official soundtrack album of the 2015 American science-fiction action film The Divergent Series: Insurgent, based on the second book of the Divergent trilogy. The score of the film was composed by Joseph Trapanese, while Randall Poster reprised his role as music supervisor. The soundtrack album along with the film's score were released exclusively as digital albums by Interscope Records on March 17, 2015.

== The Divergent Series: Insurgent – Original Motion Picture Soundtrack ==
=== Background ===
Music supervisor Randall Poster talking about the soundtrack album said that, "there is a varied and powerful collection of songs gathered on this soundtrack. Not a group of songs for the meek, but new anthems for the courageous. Music to fuel your insurgency for sure." Initially Ellie Goulding, who was featured heavily in Divergent: Original Motion Picture Soundtrack and also provided vocals for protagonist of The Divergent Series, Beatrice "Tris" Prior, was expected to return, but ultimately did not appear in the album.

M83 and Woodkid returned after appearing on the soundtrack album of the first film of the series. Additionally British rock duo Royal Blood, indie rock sister band Haim, Imagine Dragons, Anna Calvi, Lykke Li and SOHN also appear in the album.

"See What I've Become" by American recording artist, rapper and composer Zack Hemsey appeared in the official trailer of the film, but was not included in the soundtrack album.

=== Promotional singles ===
On March 2, 2015, the first promotional single from the album "Holes in the Sky" was released. The song was performed by M83 and featured HAIM. Talking about the collaboration HAIM said that, "we've been fans of Anthony Gonzalez and M83 for a long long time so when he reached out to have us sing on the song we were ecstatic. We had the best time in the studio with him, it all happened so fast and was so easy and natural. We are so excited to be a part of this movie."

The second promotional single, "Never Let You Down" by Woodkid featuring Lykke Li was released on March 9, 2015, while the third promotional single, "Sacrifice" by Zella Day was released on March 12, 2014.

Additionally two tracks from the album, "Blood Hands" by Royal Blood was originally released in August 2014 as a part of their 2014 album, and "Warriors" by Imagine Dragons, which was originally composed for League of Legends 2014 World Championship promotional video and was released digitally as a single on September 18, 2014.

=== Track listing ===
The album contains eight tracks as opposed to the sixteen tracks of the first film's soundtrack album.

No.	Title	Writer(s)	Artist(s)	Length
1.	"Holes in the Sky"	Anthony Gonzalez; Dia Frampton	M83 featuring Haim	4:21
2.	"Blood Hands"	Mike Kerr; Ben Thatcher	Royal Blood	3:07
3.	"Never Let You Down"	Woodkid; Lykke Li Zachrisson; Jeff Bhasker	Woodkid featuring Lykke Li	4:32
4.	"The Heart of You"	Anna Calvi; Andrew Wyatt; Adrian Utley	Anna Calvi	5:49
5.	"Sacrifice"	Zella Day; Xandy Barry	Zella Day	4:00
6.	"Carry Me Home"	SOHN	SOHN	4:09
7.	"Warriors"	Alex da Kid; Ben McKee; Josh Mosser; Daniel Platzman; Dan Reynolds; Wayne Sermon	Imagine Dragons	2:52
8.	"Convergence"	Joseph Trapanese	Joseph Trapanese	4:04
Total length:				32:14

=== Charts ===
Chart (2015)	Peak position
Belgian Albums (Ultratop Wallonia)	187
US Billboard 200	77
US Soundtrack Albums (Billboard)	9

== The Divergent Series: Insurgent – Original Motion Picture Score ==
The Divergent Series: Insurgent – Original Motion Picture Score

Film score by Joseph Trapanese
- Released: March 17, 2015
- Genre: Orchestral
- Length: 74:28
- Label: Interscope
- Producer: Joseph Trapanese

On November 25, 2014, Joseph Trapanese came on board as the composer of the film. He previously provided additional arrangements for Divergent. Talking about the score of the film, Trapanese said that "The first film had a lot of songs in it, very song-driven from artists like Woodkid and Ellie Goulding. It gave the film something to hold on to, to really bring you through the journey. This film, there's a lot more danger and a lot more at stake. We've vacated the song-based soundtrack, relied more on the score. The score is darker and more intense." The score album was released by Interscope Records on March 17, 2015.

=== Track listing ===
No.	Title	Length
1.	"We Found It"	4:42
2.	"Amity"	3:50
3.	"Dauntless Arrive"	3:47
4.	"Escaping Amity"	3:42
5.	"Train Attack"	3:17
6.	"Progeny"	1:55
7.	"Candor"	5:02
8.	"Truth Serum"	6:22
9.	"Test Subject"	1:38
10.	"Raiding Candor"	1:33
11.	"Dauntless Havoc"	4:41
12.	"Surrender the Traitor"	3:35
13.	"You're Worth It"	3:37
14.	"Tris Meets the Box"	5:51
15.	"Dauntless"	5:19
16.	"Erudite"	4:39
17.	"Final Sim"	4:37
18.	"You're Real"	4:26
19.	"I'm the Real You"	3:36
20.	"The Message"	3:00
Total length:		74:28
