= Willy Cartier =

French fashion model, actor, and dancer

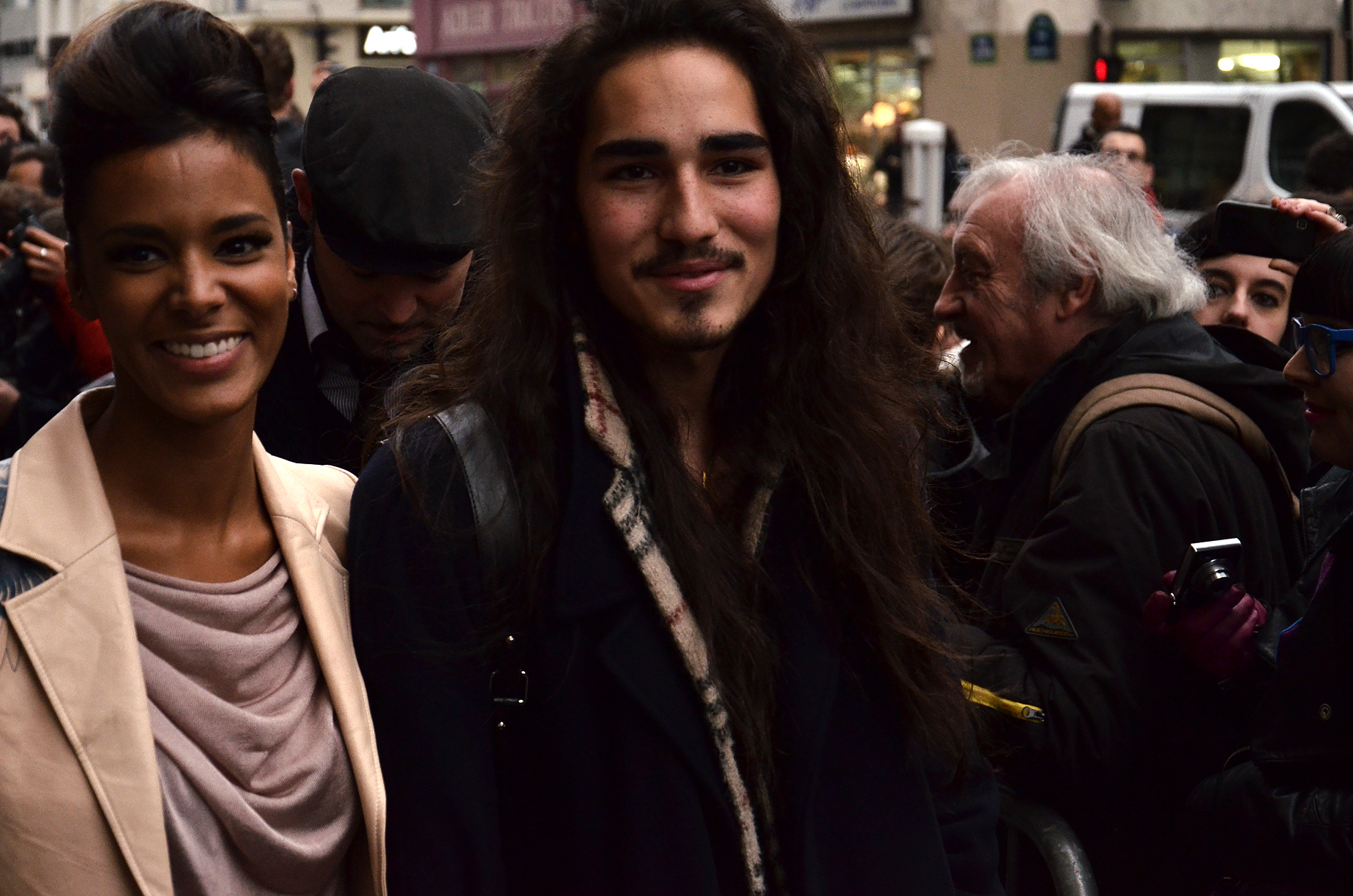
- Willy Cartier and Shy'm in 2012
- Born: September 15, 1991 (age 34); Paris
- Occupations: Model & Actor
- Years active: 2009-present
- Partner: Hiley Saintsirch
- Modeling information
- Height: 1.83 m (6 ft)
- Hair color: dark brown
- Eye color: brown
- Agency: CLICK (New York), Success Models (Paris), AGENT AGITATEUR (Paris-Acting)

Willy Cartier is a French fashion model, dancer, and actor best known for his work with Givenchy.

== Early life ==
Willy Cartier is the son of writer and painter Jack Servoz and dancer Léa Cartier. He describes his ethnic background as Vietnamese, Senegalese, and Breton. Originally hoping for a career in acting, he attended the prestigious Cours Florent, a private drama school in Paris. He also attended the International Dance Academy, where he studied dance (classic, contemporary, and jazz) and theatre.

== Career ==
Cartier began modeling in 2009, and was one of the faces for Givenchy's 2010 Fall/Winter campaign.

Cartier has modeled for Chanel, Karl Lagerfeld, Jean-Paul Gaultier, Givenchy, Diesel, and Benetton. He has appeared in the magazines Vogue, Marie Claire, Apollo Novo, Elle Man, WAD magazine, V and Numéro.

As an actor, Willy Cartier has appeared in promotional materials for perfumes by Guerlain and Diesel, and in music videos for several artists, including Frank Ocean, Woodkid, Shy'm, Laurent Voulzy, and Alain Souchon. He has also had small roles in French films and television series. He had the titular role in the 2018 Bolivian film Søren. He played the role of Attila The Hun on Science Channel’s “ Attila's Forbidden Tomb” in March, 2020. He had the titular role in the 2021 French TV Serie “FUGUEUSE”.

== Personal life ==
Cartier lives in Paris, France.

== Filmography ==
=== Feature films ===
Year	Title	Role	Director	Notes
2008	The Beautiful Person		Christophe Honoré	Credited as Willy Leservot
2013	Grand départ	Adrian	Nicolas Mercier	
2015	Des milliards de toi mon poussin	Greg	Mathilde Laconche	
2018	SØREN	Søren	Juan Carlos Valdivia	
Announced	The Thirteenth Seed	Iyari	Marian Peñalva	
