= I Love You (Woodkid song) =

2013 song by Woodkid

Single by Woodkid

from the album The Golden Age
- Released: February 9, 2013
- Recorded: 2011
- Genre: Baroque pop
- Length: 3:51
- Label: Island; Interscope
- Songwriters: Yoann Lemoine; Ambroise Willaume
- Producer: Ambroise Willaume

Woodkid singles chronology
"Run Boy Run" (2012)	"I Love You" (2013)

Music video
- "I Love You" on YouTube

"I Love You" is the third single by Woodkid, taken from his debut album The Golden Age. It was co-written by Lemoine himself and by Ambroise Willaume. Arrangements were added by Willaume. B-sides for the I Love You single were Towers, I Love You (Booka Shade Remix), and The Deer.

The single was released on 9 February 2013 as a warm-up to the imminent release of the album The Golden Age on 18 March 2013, whereas earlier two singles had been released much earlier, with "Iron" being released on March 28, 2011 and "Run Boy Run" on May 21, 2012.

== Charts ==
Single release

Chart (2013)	Peak position
Belgium (Ultratip Bubbling Under Flanders)	21
Belgium (Ultratip Bubbling Under Wallonia)	28
France (SNEP)	22
Germany (GfK)	61

== In other media ==
The song, covered by an unknown female artist, was used in a commercial entitled The Notebook for a South African insurance company. It is also used as background music in the Dauntless club scene in the 2014 movie Divergent.

The song was also in a movie series of "Tatort", a German TV-programme, called "Freddy tanzt" (Freddy dances).

The song was also used in L'Écume des jours (Boris Vian).

It was the song of the Paris bid for the 2024 Summer Olympics and the 2024 Summer Paralympics with the bid concept and slogan "Made for Sharing".

== Music video ==
The music video, starring Russian fashion model Matvey Lykov, was shot in Iceland and was directed by Yoann Lemoine himself. It was nominated for "Best Music Video" at the Camerimage International Film Festival 2013 and for "Best Cinematography in a Video" at the UK Music Video Awards 2013.
