= The Golden Age (Woodkid album) =

Studio album by Woodkid
- Released: 18 March 2013
- Recorded: 2010–2012
- Genre: Orchestral pop; chamber pop; neofolk; classical
- Length: 48:34
- Label: Green United Music

Woodkid chronology
Run Boy Run (EP) (2012)	The Golden Age (2013)	S16 (2020)

Singles from The Golden Age
- 1. "Iron" Released: 28 March 2011; 2. "Run Boy Run" Released: 21 May 2012; 3. "I Love You" Released: 9 February 2013

The Golden Age is the debut studio album from French singer-songwriter and director Woodkid. It was released on 18 March 2013 through independent label, Green United Music. Lemoine released the official album cover through a video he created himself on 14 December 2012 and released the album's corresponding track listing one week later on 21 December 2012 on his official Facebook page.

During an interview with NBHAP, Lemoine indicated that The Golden Age was inspired by his childhood, which he considered his "Golden Age".

== Singles ==
Three songs appearing in the album have been released as singles:

- "Iron" – Released on 28 March 2011
- "Run Boy Run" – Released on 21 May 2012
- "I Love You" – Released in February 2013 to coincide with official release of the album

"Run Boy Run" was used in several O_{2} adverts (those voiced by Sean Bean).

The music video for Woodkid track "Run Boy Run" was nominated for Best Short Form Music Video at the 2013 Grammy Awards. It was directed by Yoann Lemoine (Woodkid) himself.

== Reception ==
=== Critical response ===
Professional ratings
Aggregate scores
Source	Rating
Metacritic	66/100
Review scores
Source	Rating
AllMusic	3.5/5 stars
Les Inrockuptibles	4.5/5 stars
Louder Than War	8.5/10
MusicOMH	2/5 stars
NME	3/5 stars
PopMatters	5/10
Raidió Teilifís Éireann	5/5 stars
The Guardian	4/5 stars
The Line of Best Fit	8/10

On Metacritic, the album has a score of 66 out of 100, based on 9 reviews.

Logan Smithson of PopMatters states "There can be no doubt against the fact that The Golden Age feels powerful. Whether it’s more of a thoughtless Michael Bay thriller or a deep adventure with the intricacies of Christopher Nolan, there are definitely explosions galore and production values that will keep you on the edge of your seat. There aren’t many albums that sound like Woodkid’s The Golden Age. If you’re in the mood for something bold, with loud production and poetic lyrics, The Golden Age might be worth hearing. It just might not be an experience that sticks with you in the long run."

Heather Phares of AllMusic said that while "it's beyond cliche to call sweeping, orchestral music "filmic," but in the case of music video director Yoann Lemoine's debut album as Woodkid, The Golden Age, the term fits." He also stated that "Lemoine's music is more in line with Antony & the Johnsons -- lavish, often torchy songs that pair dramatic backdrops with his charmingly imperfect vocals", and, despite the fact that it is an "at times exhausting album, The Golden Age shows Lemoine is skilled at making music as well as music videos."

== Track listing ==
No.	Title	Writer(s)	Length
1.	"The Golden Age"	Yoann Lemoine, Dany Héricourt	3:44
2.	"Run Boy Run"	Lemoine, Ambroise Willaume	3:33
3.	"The Great Escape"	Lemoine, Héricourt, Guillaume Brière	3:17
4.	"Boat Song"	Lemoine, Mitchell Yoshida	4:28
5.	"I Love You"	Lemoine, Willaume, arranged by Ambroise Willaume	3:51
6.	"The Shore"	Lemoine	4:14
7.	"Ghost Lights"	Lemoine, arranged by Ambroise Willaume	3:41
8.	"Shadows"	Lemoine	2:02
9.	"Stabat Mater"	Lemoine, Héricourt, SebastiAn, arranged by SebastiAn	2:49
10.	"Conquest of Spaces"	Lemoine, Héricourt	4:30
11.	"Falling"	Lemoine	0:44
12.	"Where I Live"	Lemoine	4:26
13.	"Iron"	Lemoine, arranged by Gustave Rudman	3:23
14.	"The Other Side"	Lemoine, Héricourt, arranged by Ambroise Willaume	3:41

== Charts ==
=== Weekly charts ===
Chart (2013)	Peak position
Austrian Albums (Ö3 Austria)	13
Belgian Albums (Ultratop Flanders)	34
Belgian Albums (Ultratop Wallonia)	6
Dutch Albums (Album Top 100)	23
French Albums (SNEP)	2
German Albums (Offizielle Top 100)	8
Irish Albums (IRMA)	74
Italian Albums (FIMI)	55
Swiss Albums (Schweizer Hitparade)	4
UK Albums (Official Charts)	38
US Billboard 200	133
US Top Rock Albums (Billboard)	38

=== Year-end charts ===
Chart (2013)	Position
Belgian Albums (Ultratop Wallonia)	74
French Albums (SNEP)	45
Swiss Albums (Schweizer Hitparade)	72

Chart (2014)	Position
Belgian Albums (Ultratop Wallonia)	165
French Albums (SNEP)	139

== Certifications ==
Region	Certification	Certified units/sales
Germany (BVMI)	Gold	100,000^{‡}
Switzerland (IFPI Switzerland)	Gold	10,000^{^}
^{^} Shipments figures based on certification alone.^{‡} Sales+streaming figures based on certification alone.
