= Iron (Woodkid song) =

2011 song by Woodkid

Single by Woodkid

from the album The Golden Age
- Released: March 28, 2011
- Recorded: 2011
- Genre: Baroque pop, neofolk, experimental
- Length: 3:22
- Label: Green United, Island, Interscope
- Songwriter: Yoann Lemoine
- Producer: Gustave Rudman!(arrangement)

Woodkid singles chronology
"Iron" (2011)	"Run Boy Run" (2012)

Music video
- "Iron" on YouTube

"Iron" is the debut single by Woodkid from his album The Golden Age which was released in 2013. It was written by Yoann Lemoine with arrangements by Gustave Rudman. The single was released on March 28, 2011. The song gained popularity after being used in a trailer for Assassin's Creed: Revelations. It was also sampled in Kendrick Lamar's "The Spiteful Chant" on his 2011 album Section.80.

On 5 October 2021, a newer arrangement of Iron, titled Iron 2021, was released in conjunction with the original song's 10th anniversary.

== Track list ==
Iron single (promo)

1. "Iron" (album version) (3:22)

Iron EP

1. "Iron" (Single Version) (3:12)
2. "Brooklyn" (3:33)
3. "Baltimore's Fireflies" (4:10)
4. "Wasteland" (3:13)
5. "Iron" (Remix By Mystery Jets) (4:29)
6. "Iron" (Remix By Gucci Vump) (5:37)

== Charts ==
Chart (2011–2014)	Peak position
Ultratop 40 Belgian Singles Chart (Wallonia)	21
SNEP French Singles Chart	29
UK Singles Chart	94

== Music video ==
The music video, starring the fashion models Agyness Deyn, Matvey Lykov, Willy Cartier and Ross Tanner, was directed by Yoann Lemoine himself. It was awarded "Best Music Video" at the Namur Film Festival 2011, "Best Art Direction" and Best Cinematography at the Antville Music Video Awards 2011, and won the Grand Prix at the Protoclip International Music Video Festival 2011. It was nominated for "Best Cinematography" , for "Best Music Video" at the Camerimage International Film Festival 2011 and for "Best International Pop Video", "Best Styling in a Video" and "Best Visual Effects in a Video" at the UK Music Video Awards.
