= Run Boy Run (song) =

Single by Woodkid

from the album The Golden Age
- B-side: Instrumental (7")
- Released: 21 May 2012
- Recorded: 2011
- Genre: Chamber pop; neofolk; martial industrial
- Length: 3:33
- Label: Green United; Universal
- Songwriters: Yoann Lemoine; Ambroise Willaume
- Producers: The Shoes; Woodkid

Woodkid singles chronology
"Iron" (2011)	"Run Boy Run" (2012)	"I Love You" (2013)

Music video
- "Run Boy Run" on YouTube

"Run Boy Run" is a song by Yoann Lemoine, under his stage name Woodkid. It was released as the second single from his debut studio album, The Golden Age (2013). It was written by Lemoine and Ambroise Willaume from the French band Revolver. The single was released on 21 May 2012, becoming his highest-charting single. "Run Boy Run" was certified gold in Germany in 2014. The song has been described as an LGBTQ anthem.

The music video for "Run Boy Run" was nominated for Best Short Form Music Video at the 2013 Grammy Awards.

== Music video ==
The music video shows a young boy running, surrounded by various beasts that pick him up when he falls, hand him a sword and a shield, and put a horned helmet on his head. The video was directed by Lemoine himself.

== In popular culture ==
- "Run Boy Run" was used in adverts for brands like O_{2}, and Vodafone.
- The song has been used in the films The Maze Runner and Divergent.
- The song was used for a Paso Doble dance by Bethany Mota and Derek Hough on the show Dancing with the Stars.
- It was used during the Wind Games 2017 by Kyra Poh whose performance won the Gold in Solo Freestyle.
- It was used in the ending of Episode 2 of the Netflix show 13 Reasons Why.
- It was used in the beginning of Episode 2 of the Netflix show The Umbrella Academy.
- It was used in a trailer for the 2015 video game Dying Light.
- It was used in a trailer for the 2017 racing game Gran Turismo Sport.
- A portion was used by the Mandarins Drum and Bugle Corps in their 2019 program subTerra.
- French figure skater Adam Siao Him Fa performed his free skate to "Run Boy Run" when he won the men's title at the 2023 European Figure Skating Championships in Espoo, Finland.

== Use in politics ==
In 2014, Woodkid objected after the anti-same-sex marriage movement La Manif pour tous used his music during a demonstration in Rome, mocking the group for using what he described as "the most pro-gay music". When "Run Boy Run" was played again at a La Manif pour tous march in Paris in 2016, he said he had not authorized its use and "did not support this movement in any way". The song was later also used in a campaign video for the Donald Trump 2024 presidential campaign. In response Lemoine stated that the use of the song was never authorized and called upon his label Universal Music France to react against it.

== Track listing ==
1. "Run Boy Run" (album version) – (3:33)
2. "Run Boy Run" (Sebastian remix) – (3:52)
3. "Run Boy Run" (Tepr remix) – (5:52)
4. "Run Boy Run" (Ostend remix) – (4:15)

== Charts ==
Single release

Chart (2013–14)	Peak position
Austrian Singles Chart	39
Belgium Ultratip 40 (Wallonia)	43
France (SNEP)	52
German Singles Chart	11
Hungary (Single Top 40)	10
UK Singles Chart	44

Run Boy Run – Remixes (EP) position

Chart (2013)	Peak position
French Albums (SNEP)	31

=== Year-end charts ===
Chart (2013)	Position
Germany (Media Control AG)	85

== Certifications ==
Region	Certification	Certified units/sales
Germany (BVMI)	Gold	150,000^{^}
Italy (FIMI)	Gold	25,000^{‡}
United Kingdom (BPI)	Gold	400,000^{‡}
^{^} Shipments figures based on certification alone.^{‡} Sales+streaming figures based on certification alone.

== See also ==
- Musicians who oppose Donald Trump's use of their music
