= Woodkid =

French music video director, graphic designer and musician

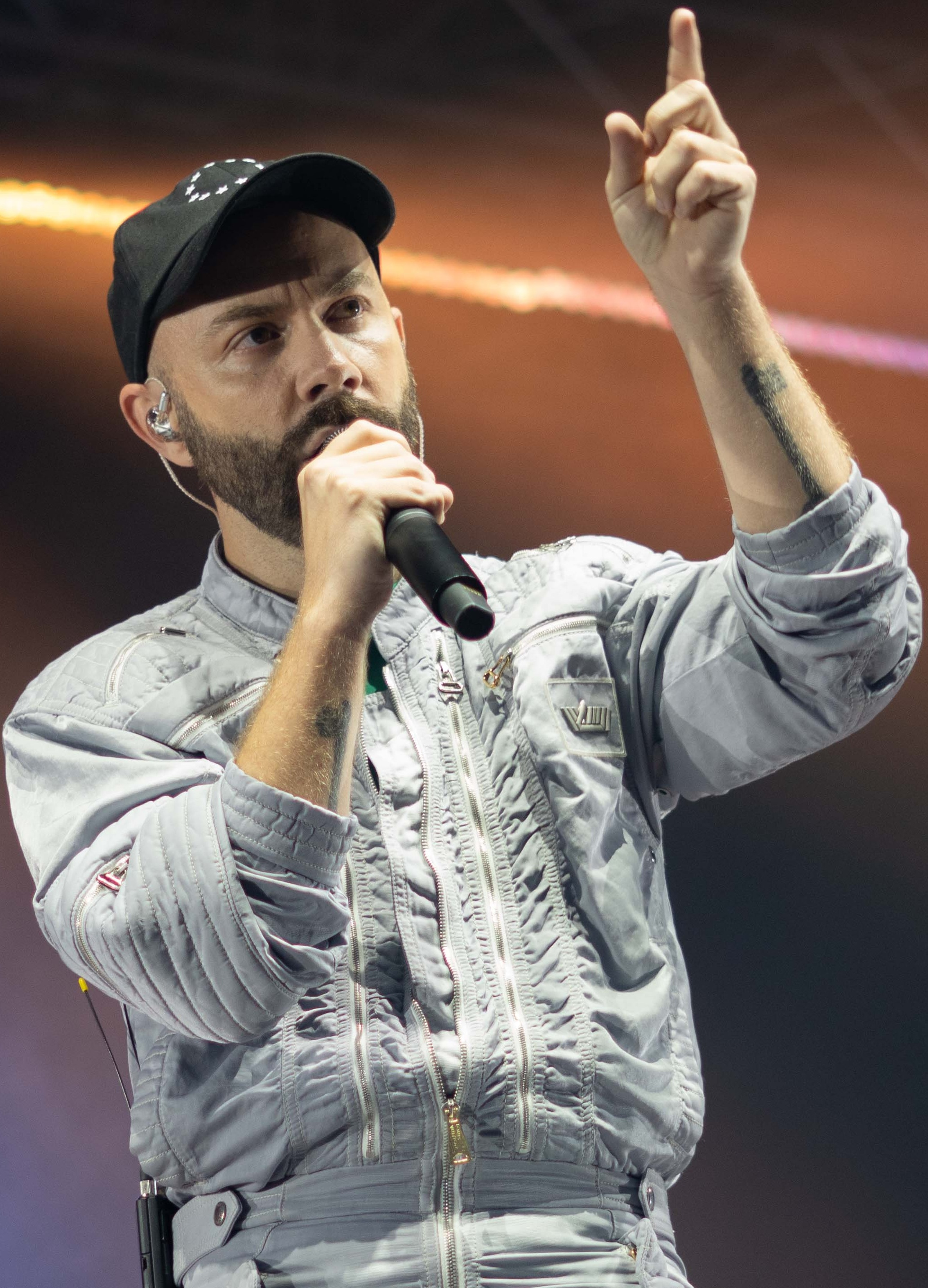
- Woodkid in 2021

Background information
- Born: Yoann Lemoine; 16 March 1983 (age 43); Tassin-la-Demi-Lune, Rhône-Alpes, France
- Education: Notre-Dame de Mongré; École Émile-Cohl
- Genres: Pop; chamber pop; neofolk; electronic
- Occupations: Music video director; composer; singer-songwriter
- Instrument: Vocals
- Years active: 2006–present

Yoann Lemoine (French pronunciation: [jɔan ləmwan]; born 16 March 1983), known professionally as Woodkid, is a French music video director, graphic designer, composer, and singer-songwriter. He first gained international recognition as a music video director before launching his recording career with the EP Iron (2011) and the studio album The Golden Age (2013). He has also composed for films, television, video games and international events, including Desierto, Arcane, the Paris 2024 handover sequence at the Tokyo 2020 Olympic closing ceremony, and Death Stranding 2: On the Beach.

Woodkid has received multiple awards, including a Victoires de la Musique and eight Cannes Lions, as well as nominations for three Grammy Awards, a British Academy Games Award, an Ariel Award, and five Camerimage Awards. As a musician and composer, he has collaborated with filmmakers, fashion houses, and video game developers, including Ubisoft, Kojima Productions, Louis Vuitton, and Vacheron Constantin. His work is characterized by cinematic visual storytelling, orchestral arrangements, and recurring themes of mythology, industrialization, identity, and the transition from childhood to adulthood.

== Life and career ==
=== Early life ===
I embraced Catholicism very strongly during adolescence, then when I discovered my homosexuality, or at least when I understood what it meant, the rejection was even more powerful, very adolescent, in the face of the absurdity of Catholicism and dogmas.

— Woodkid on his religious background

Yoann Lemoine was born on 16 March 1983 in Tassin-la-Demi-Lune, Rhône-Alpes, France, (Note: Attributed to multiple references:) to a mother of Polish-Jewish origin, and a French father who worked as an advertising executive. His grandparents were Eastern European Jews who, having fled the Holocaust, renounced their faith in France. After the fall of the Berlin Wall, he regularly spent summers with his maternal family in Poland, an experience that later deepened his understanding of his family's history. His mother raised him partly in a Catholic school despite her Jewish background. He attended Notre-Dame de Mongré in Villefranche-sur-Saône from middle to high school, where former English and art teachers described him as "exceptionally brilliant". As a teenager, his father bought him a Macintosh computer, on which he taught himself Photoshop and began creating digital images. Woodkid later studied illustration and animation at the École Émile-Cohl, (Note: Attributed to multiple references:) where he was part of the Sempé class, and was later described by the school's deputy director as "a very good student" with "a real aptitude" for the craft. He graduated with honors in 2004, before moving to the United Kingdom to study silk-screen printing at Swindon College.

That same year, he relocated to Paris to begin his career, working on video game adaptation of Luc Besson's film Arthur et les Minimoys, converting the film's environments for the game. This experience convinced him that he was unsuited to working as an employee under someone else's direction. He subsequently contributed to Sofia Coppola's film Marie Antoinette by creating a series of sketches, and was later commissioned by Universal in 2006 to direct a promotional documentary about Richie Havens. After he expressed a desire to learn guitar, Havens gifted him a four-string instrument, which Woodkid later used to compose the earliest songs for his musical project. It was during this period, in 2006, that he adopted the stage name Woodkid. Although he initially described the moniker in 2013 as the story of a child escaping his family environment to build an adult identity, he later said it had simply originated as his MySpace pseudonym from his early guitar-learning days, adding that he had not really realized it would become his stage name and calling it "a lame pseudonym that has stuck with me". He subsequently signed with the independent record label GUM in 2008.

=== 2010–2012: Graffiti, Iron and Run Boy Run ===
In January 2010, Woodkid directed Graffiti, an HIV/AIDS awareness campaign for AIDES. Prior to its official release, an unfinished version of the video leaked online and quickly became an internet sensation, surpassing 100,000 views within 24 hours and being reposted across nearly 3,000 blogs. The campaign ultimately accumulated over 10 million views on YouTube, earned four Cannes Lions, and was later named one of Adweek's "30 Freakiest Ads of 2010".

Before launching his recording career, Woodkid established an international reputation as a music video director. (Note: Attributed to multiple references:) Between 2010 and 2012, he directed videos for Katy Perry's "Teenage Dream", Taylor Swift's "Back to December", Lana Del Rey's "Born to Die" and "Blue Jeans", as well as Drake and Rihanna's "Take Care". "Blue Jeans" was nominated for Best Music Video at the 20th Camerimage Film Festival, while "Born to Die" won Best Pop Video – International at the 2012 UK Music Video Awards. Woodkid later said that his work with major recording artists enabled him to reinvest his earnings into his debut album, including hiring the Orchestre National de France.

Meanwhile, in March 2011, Woodkid released his debut EP, Iron, featuring the title track as its lead single. The song was accompanied by a self-directed music video. Shortly after its release, "Iron" attracted widespread online attention, with Les Inrockuptibles describing the EP as a striking debut and noting that it revealed Woodkid's songwriting talent from his very first release. The music video earned a nomination for Best Music Video at the 19th Camerimage Film Festival, and won the Prix du Meilleur Clip at the 26th Festival International du Film Francophone de Namur. The song was later featured in the trailer for Assassin's Creed Revelations, and in Dior Homme's Fall/Winter 2013 menswear collection show.

Woodkid released the self-directed music video for "Run Boy Run" in May 2012, the title track from his second EP of the same name. The black-and-white visual showcases highly symbolic themes and a cinematic visual style, with both Vice and The Line of Best Fit comparing its imagery to Where the Wild Things Are. The music video was nominated for Best Short Form Music Video at the 55th Annual Grammy Awards, and won the Prix du Meilleur Clip at the 27th Festival International du Film Francophone de Namur. The track later appeared across advertisements, film, and television over the years, including Divergent, The Umbrella Academy, Dying Light, and the BBC's closing montage for the 2014 FIFA World Cup Final. In September 2012, Woodkid sold out his first official Paris concert at the Grand Rex several months before the release of his debut album. Les Inrockuptibles likened the buzz surrounding Woodkid to the anticipation that preceded Daft Punk's album Homework.

=== 2013–2018: The Golden Age and collaborations ===
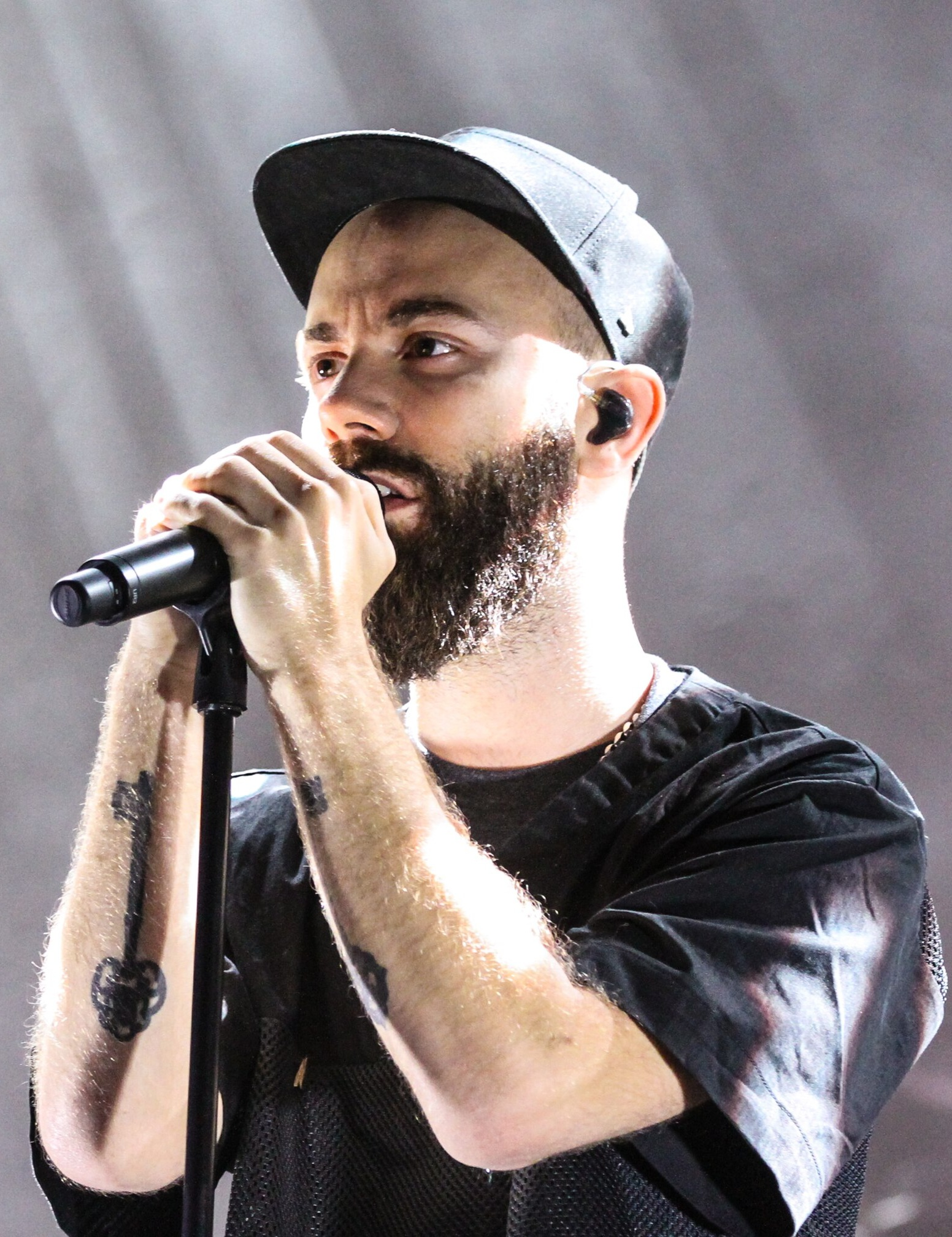
Woodkid performing at the Melt Festival in 2013.

Woodkid's first studio album, The Golden Age, was released on 18 March 2013, preceded by the singles "Iron" and "Run Boy Run". The record received generally positive reviews from music critics. The Guardian praised its "filmic" quality, describing it as "a grand alchemy" of dramatic orchestral pop, swelling strings, and crashing drums. Les Inrockuptibles described the album as "a shock", calling it "more than an album" and praising its class, ambition, and epic scope. Raidió Teilifís Éireann commended Woodkid's visual imagination and orchestral arrangements, noting that he succeeded in establishing bold imagery in the listener's mind. NME, however, offered a more reserved assessment, praising the album's polished production while suggesting that much of its lyrical content felt "quite earnest". By 2020, the album had sold over 800,000 copies worldwide, with more than 600,000 copies attributed to international exports. (Note: Attributed to multiple references:)

Following the release of The Golden Age, Woodkid served as creative director for Pharrell Williams' interactive 24-hour music video Happy, contributing to its creative concept, and later released a string-driven "Sad" remix of the song. In February 2014, he won the Révélation Scène award at the 29th Victoires de la Musique, and was also nominated for Best Music Video for "I Love You". That same month, he designed the first 3D poster for the 48th Montreux Jazz Festival, joining a lineage of poster artists that included Andy Warhol, Keith Haring, David Bowie, and Phil Collins. In April of that year, he made his Coachella debut, where Rolling Stone named his performance one of the festival's "50 Best Things We Saw at Coachella 2014". Later that month, he composed the original score for Les Bosquets, a ballet conceived and directed by JR for the New York City Ballet. JR later adapted the ballet into a 2015 short film of the same name, incorporating Woodkid's music alongside additional compositions by Hans Zimmer and Pharrell Williams. On 26 June 2014, Woodkid headlined the outdoor Bell Opening Event at the Montreal International Jazz Festival, attracting an estimated audience of over 100,000.

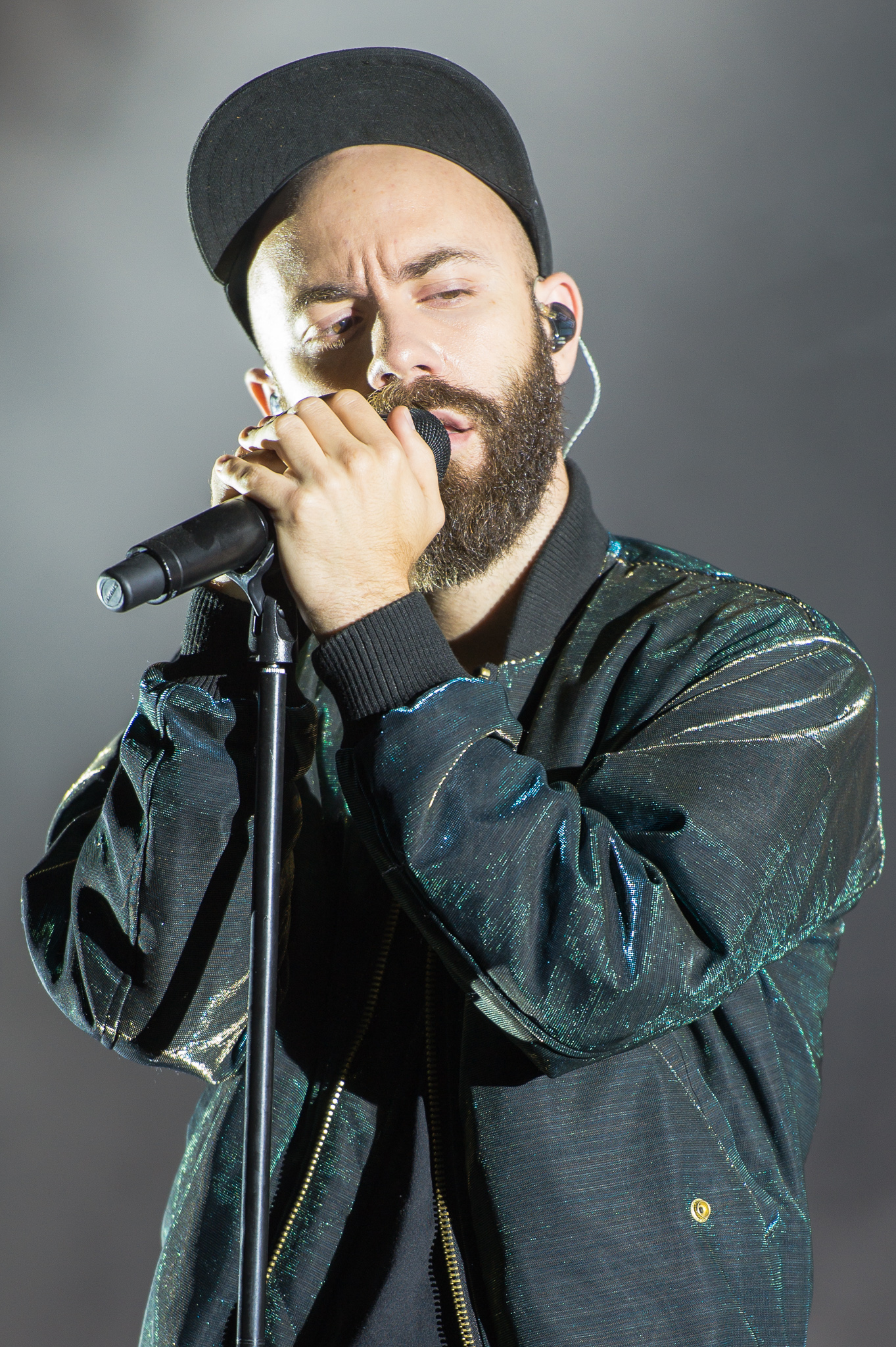
Woodkid performing at the Rock im Park Festival in 2014.

On 10 July 2014, Woodkid released the self-directed music video for "The Golden Age", presented as an 11-minute narrative short film rather than a traditional music video. The film concluded a trilogy of long-form videos for his debut album, with Woodkid also serving as the visual effects artist for its opening sequence. For its extended score, he collaborated with composer Max Richter, who lengthened and re-recorded his composition "Embers" to match the song's rhythm and tonality. Later that month, Ubisoft featured the track in the cinematic trailer for Assassin's Creed Unity, while Woodkid announced a temporary hiatus from his musical project to focus on other creative endeavors, including his debut feature film. He released the piano demo "Do You Love Me After All?" as a farewell to The Golden Age era. The music video was later nominated for Best Music Video at the 57th Annual Grammy Awards. In March 2015, Woodkid collaborated with Lykke Li on the song "Never Let You Down", which was featured on the soundtrack for the film The Divergent Series: Insurgent.

After announcing his hiatus, Woodkid composed the soundtrack for Jonás Cuarón's thriller film Desierto, which won the Best Original Music award at the 38th Havana Film Festival, and earned him a nomination in the same category at the 59th Ariel Awards. He also released "Land of All" as the soundtrack's lead single and the film's end-credits theme, accompanied by a lyric video. Beyond his film work, in late 2015, he directed the ANTIdiaRy promotional teaser campaign for Rihanna's eighth studio album, Anti. In July 2016, Woodkid composed the score for Ellis, a short film directed by JR and starring Robert De Niro, with Nils Frahm co-writing and performing the soundtrack. Released as a mini-album through Erased Tapes, the record featured piano parts composed by Woodkid before Frahm stripped down the orchestration, with proceeds from album sales benefiting the refugee rescue charity Sea-Watch. That same year, he co-produced Mykki Blanco's debut album Mykki alongside Jeremiah Meece, contributing to several tracks. Woodkid also established an ongoing creative partnership with designer Nicolas Ghesquière beginning in 2017, having composed the soundtracks for around ten Louis Vuitton fashion shows by 2020. In 2018, he and Louis Garrel recorded a symphonic cover of Yves Simon's "L'Aérogramme de Los Angeles" for the tribute album Génération(s) éperdue(s). It marked Woodkid's first recorded performance in French.

=== 2019–2025: S16, Vacheron Constantin and Death Stranding 2 ===
In May 2019, Woodkid issued the EP Woodkid for Nicolas Ghesquière – Louis Vuitton Works On, which featured guest vocals from Jennifer Connelly and Moses Sumney. That December, he announced his second studio album, marking seven years since his debut record. The project was preceded by the lead single "Goliath" in April 2020, whose music video was later nominated for Best Music Video at the 63rd Annual Grammy Awards, and for Création Audiovisuelle at the 36th Victoires de la Musique, before the full record was released on 16 October 2020. Titled S16 in reference to sulfur's chemical symbol and atomic number on the periodic table, the album was developed through collaborations with Ryan Lott and the Suginami Junior Chorus of Tokyo, while also incorporating Cristal Baschet instruments and recordings of Jean Tinguely's kinetic sculptures. Its lyrics explore themes of addiction, political awakening, industrialization, and individual and collective responsibility, with "Shift" originating from Woodkid's response to the 2015 Paris terrorist attacks. To promote the release, he launched an alternate reality game built around the fictional mining company Adaptive Minerals.

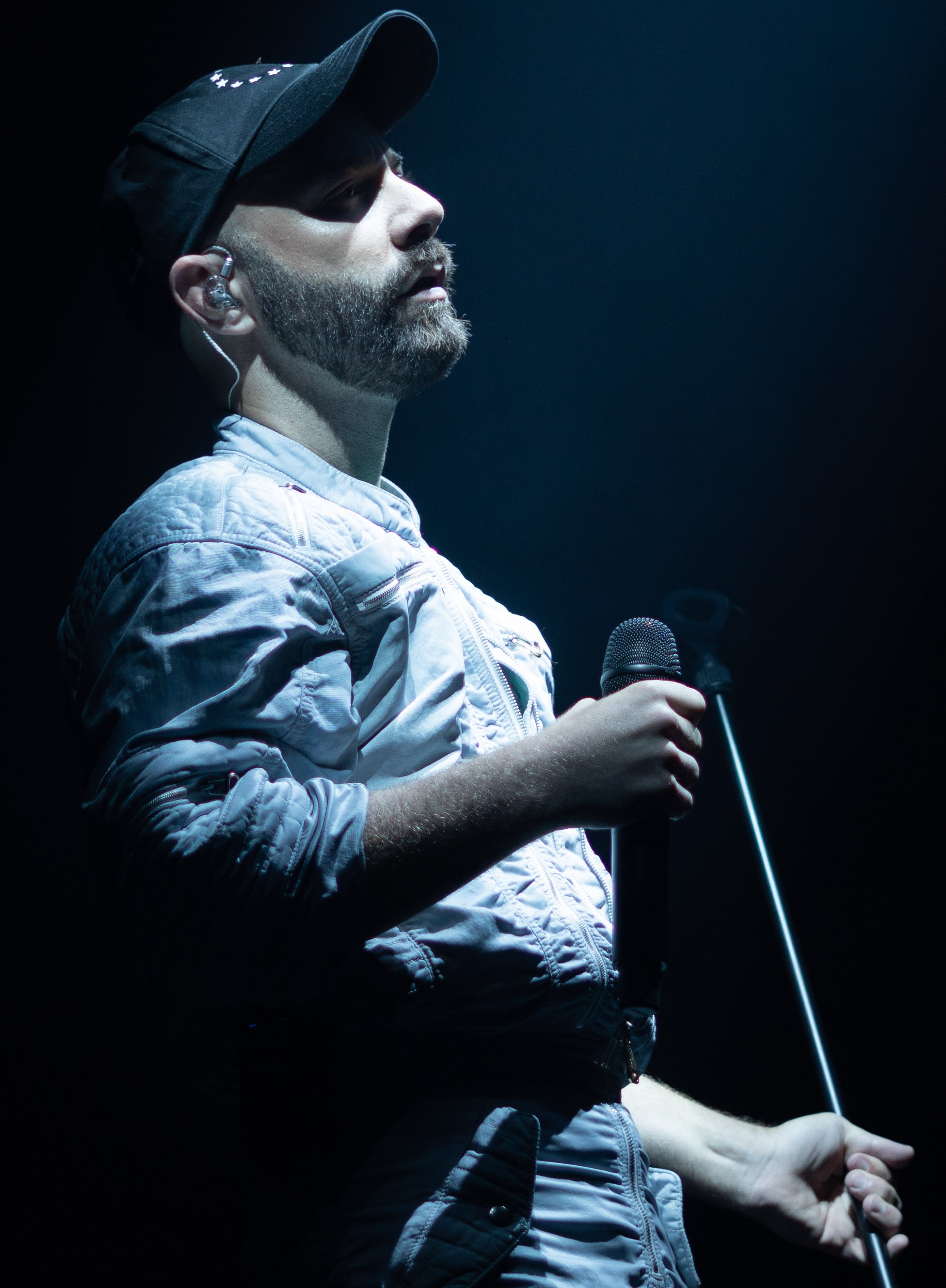
Woodkid performing at the Stereoparc Festival in 2021.

In July 2021, Woodkid was commissioned by Paris 2024 to compose the original piece "Prologue", recorded with the Orchestre National de France and the Maîtrise de Radio France for the Paris 2024 handover sequence at the closing ceremony of the Tokyo 2020 Olympic Games. Released on 6 August 2021, the piece was performed live by Woodkid at a free concert at the Trocadéro two days later. That same year, he contributed the original song "Guns for Hire" to the soundtrack of the first season of Arcane. In February 2022, he was nominated in the Concert category at the 37th Victoires de la Musique. He later collaborated with Mylène Farmer on her twelfth studio album, L'Emprise. He was a principal contributor to the album's music and visual design, composing and producing seven of its twelve main tracks, while creating Farmer's digital avatar for its artwork. He returned to Arcane in 2024 with "To Ashes and Blood" for the series' second season. The track incorporates a fictional language created specifically for the series.

Parallel to his work in entertainment, Woodkid began a partnership with Vacheron Constantin in 2022. As part of the partnership, he served as a mentor for emerging artists through the "One of Not Many Mentorship Program", an initiative established in 2018 by the watchmaker and Abbey Road Studios. He later composed original works for the brand, including Euclidean Pulses 1 (2023), inspired by Vacheron Constantin's "Less'ential" theme. In 2025, to mark the company's 270th anniversary, he composed three original melodies for La Quête du Temps, a unique astronomical automaton clock exhibited as the centrepiece of the Mécaniques d'Art exhibition at the Louvre Museum.

His work in screen and digital media included composing the main title theme for Roland Emmerich's 2024 series Those About to Die, as well as co-composing Hideo Kojima's video game Death Stranding 2: On the Beach, with his song "To the Wilder" being featured in the game's trailer. Originally approached to write a single song, his involvement expanded during the COVID-19 pandemic into a three-year collaboration to score the entire project. These compositions were deeply integrated into development, with the music and game content evolving together throughout production. The 16-track soundtrack album, titled Woodkid for Death Stranding 2, was released on 13 June 2025 and features collaborations with Elle Fanning and Bryce Dessner. For the game, he composed procedural music whose individual elements could be dynamically recombined based on the player's actions, creating different musical variations during gameplay. Alongside making a cameo appearance in the game, Woodkid was nominated for Best Score and Music at The Game Awards 2025, and the 2026 BAFTA Games Awards, while winning a Guild of Music Supervisors Award for Best Music Supervision in a Video Game, and a Game Audio Network Guild Award for Best Main Theme.

=== 2026–present: Black Flag Resynced ===
In June 2026, Woodkid collaborated with Ubisoft on Assassin's Creed Black Flag Resynced, recording a reimagined version of "Leave Her Johnny" for the game's soundtrack and reveal trailer. He said that the Assassin's Creed series had played an important role in his career, recalling that the use of "Iron" in the trailer for Assassin's Creed Revelations had helped define his artistic direction.

== Personal life ==
In a 2014 interview with Interview Magazine, Woodkid explained that growing up as a gay kid made him want to leave the countryside for the city, where he could find people like him. He also said he had long been fascinated by America "in a positive and negative way," which motivated his move to the United States. In 2020, Woodkid told Le Progrès that he had been vegetarian for a long time but had resumed eating meat in a more considered way because he missed Lyon's regional specialties.

In November 2021, Woodkid condemned a video published by Génération Z, a youth support group backing presidential candidate Éric Zemmour, for using his song "Iron" "in a totally illegal manner". Calling it a "propaganda video," the artist stated on social media that he "clearly intend[ed] to initiate proceedings" against the organization. The following month, Le Figaro reported that he had decided to pursue legal action against the group. In 2024, during the United States presidential election campaign, he criticized Donald Trump for using "Run Boy Run" in campaign rallies and videos without authorization. Woodkid described the track as "a LGBT+ anthem wrote by me, a proud LGBT+ musician," and urged his label not to be complicit.

== Discography ==
=== Video games ===
Year	Title	Notes	Ref.
2025	Death Stranding 2: On the Beach	Composer	
2026	Assassin's Creed Black Flag Resynced	Reworked "Leave Her Johnny"	

=== Film and television ===
Year	Title	Notes	Ref.
2015	The Divergent Series: Insurgent	Film; performed "Never Let You Down" (with Lykke Li)	
2015	Desierto	Film; composer, performed "Land of All"	
2015	Ellis	Short film; co-composer (with Nils Frahm)	
2021–2024	Arcane	TV series; performed "Guns for Hire" (Season 1) and "To Ashes and Blood" (Season 2)	
2024	Those About to Die	TV series; Opening title theme	

=== Albums ===
==== Studio albums ====
Title	Details	Peak chart positions										Certifications
Title	Details	FRA	AUT	BEL (FL)	BEL (WA)	GER	NLD	SWI	UK	US	US Rock	Certifications
The Golden Age	Released: 18 March 2013; Label: Green United Music; Format: CD, DL, LP, streaming	2	13	6	34	8	23	4	38	133	38	SNEP: Platinum; BVMI: Gold; IFPI SWI: Gold
S16	Released: 16 October 2020; Label: Green United Music; Format: CD, DL, LP, streaming	13	39	138	14	30	—	5	—	—	—	
"—" denotes a recording that did not chart or was not released in that territory.

==== EPs ====
Title	Album details	Charts
Title	Album details	FRA
Iron	Released: 1 January 2013; Label: Green United Music; Format: Digital download	110
Run Boy Run	Released: 1 January 2013; Label: Green United Music; Format: Digital download	31
Ellis	Released: 8 July 2016; Label: Erased Tapes; Format: Digital download	—
Woodkid for Nicolas Ghesquière – Louis Vuitton Works One	Released: 7 May 2019; Label: Island Records; Format: Digital download	—

=== Singles ===
==== As lead artist ====
Title	Year	Peak chart positions							Certifications	Album
Title	Year	FRA	AUT	BEL (FL)	BEL (WA) Tip	GER	SWI	UK	Certifications	Album
"Iron"	2011	29	—	21	—	—	—	94		The Golden Age
"Run Boy Run"	2012	52	39	— (Note: "Run Boy Run" did not enter the Ultratop 50, but peaked at number 43 on the Flemish Ultratip chart.)	55	11	60	44	BPI: Platinum; BVMI: Gold	The Golden Age
"I Love You"	2013	22	—	— (Note: "I Love You" did not enter the Ultratop 50, but peaked at number 28 on the Flemish Ultratip chart.)	17	61	—	—		The Golden Age
"The Golden Age"	2013	131	—	—	—	—	—	—		The Golden Age
"Never Let You Down" (featuring Lykke Li)	2015	118	—	—	—	—	—	—		The Divergent Series: Insurgent
"Volcano" (Note: In November 2013, Woodkid first performed "Volcano" live at the Zénith in Paris, with an official live recording published online by his label shortly afterward. The instrumental track was performed exclusively during his concerts and did not appear on any of his studio albums. Two years after its live debut, Woodkid recorded and released the song's studio version as a free download.)	2015	—	—	—	—	—	—	—		Non-album single
"Land of All"	2016	86	—	—	—	—	—	—		Desierto – Original Soundtrack
"Winter Morning I" (with Nils Frahm)	2016	144	—	—	—	—	—	—		Ellis
"L'Aérogramme de Los Angeles" (with Louis Garrel)	2018	200	—	—	—	—	—	—		Génération(s) Eperdue(s)
"Goliath"	2020	22	—	—	—	—	—	—		S16
"Pale Yellow"	2020	70	—	—	—	—	—	—		S16
"Horizons Into Battlegrounds"	2020	55	—	—	—	—	—	—		S16
"To the Wilder"	2025	—	—	—	—	—	—	—		Woodkid for Death Stranding 2: On the Beach
"—" denotes a recording that did not chart or was not released in that territory.

==== As featured artist ====
Title	Year	Album
"Clear" (Panteros666 featuring Woodkid)	2015	Non-album single
"Highschool Never Ends" (Mykki Blanco featuring Woodkid)	2016	Mykki
"Karma" (Mahmood featuring Woodkid)	2021	Ghettolimpo

==== Other charted songs ====
Title	Year	Peak chart positions	Album
Title	Year	WW	Album
"To Ashes and Blood"	2024	181	Arcane League of Legends: Season 2

== Videography ==
=== Music videos ===
Work	Year	Artist(s)	Director(s)	Ref.
"Evergreen"	2007	Axelle Renoir	Yoann Lemoine	
"Au Grand Jamais"	2008	Bensé	Yoann Lemoine	
"Demain"	2008	Berry	Yoann Lemoine	
"Ce Jeu"	2008	Yelle	Yoann Lemoine	
"Faut-il, faut-il pas ?"	2009	Nolwenn Leroy	Yoann Lemoine	
"Mistake"	2009	Moby	Yoann Lemoine	
"Dreaming of Another World"	2010	Mystery Jets	Yoann Lemoine	
"Teenage Dream"	2010	Katy Perry	Yoann Lemoine	
"Back to December"	2011	Taylor Swift	Yoann Lemoine	
"Wastin' Time"	2011	The Shoes	Yoann Lemoine	
"Iron"	2011	Woodkid	Yoann Lemoine	
"Born to Die"	2011	Lana Del Rey	Yoann Lemoine	
"Take Care"	2012	Drake, Rihanna	Yoann Lemoine	
"Blue Jeans"	2012	Lana Del Rey	Yoann Lemoine	
"Run Boy Run"	2012	Woodkid	Yoann Lemoine	
"I Love You"	2013	Woodkid	Yoann Lemoine	
"The Golden Age"	2014	Woodkid	Yoann Lemoine	
"Jewels"	2014	Black Atlass	Yoann Lemoine	
"Land of All"	2016	Woodkid	Yoann Lemoine	
"Sign of the Times"	2017	Harry Styles	Yoann Lemoine	
"Goliath"	2020	Woodkid	Yoann Lemoine	
"In Your Likeness"	2020	Woodkid	Yoann Lemoine	
"Killer"	2022	FKA twigs	Yoann Lemoine	
"Reactor"	2022	Woodkid	Saad Moosajee	

=== Commercials ===
Title	Year	Brand	Region	Ref.
Le Voyage / Balloon	2008	TiJi	France	
News	2009	France 24	France	
Graffiti	2010	AIDES	France	
An Incredible Light Taste	2010	Lipton	France	
Twirly-gig	2011	Cadbury	United Kingdom	
Premier Parfum	2012	Lolita Lempicka	France	
ANTIdiaRy	2016	Samsung	United States	

== Awards and nominations ==
Organizations (Note: Awards, festivals, honors and other miscellaneous organizations are listed in alphabetical order.)	Year (Note: Indicates the year of ceremony. Each year is linked to the article about the awards held that year, wherever possible.)	Category	Nominated work	Result	Ref.
A Shaded View on Fashion Film	2010	Special Jury Prize	Light	Won	
ADC Annual Awards	2017	Art Direction / Digital - Single	ANTIdiaRy	Bronze	
ADC Annual Awards	2017	Craft in Digital / Art Direction Single	ANTIdiaRy	Merit	
ADC Annual Awards	2017	Apps / Games / Entertainment - Single	ANTIdiaRy	Merit	
ADC Annual Awards	2017	Interactive / 360 Video - Single	ANTIdiaRy	Merit	
AICP Show	2023	Cinematography	Dom Pérignon	Shortlisted	
Ariel Awards	2017	Best Original Music	Desierto	Nominated	
ASCAP Composers' Choice Awards	2026	Video Game Score of the Year	Death Stranding 2: On the Beach	Nominated	
Berlin Music Video Awards	2023	Best Animation	"Reactor"	Nominated	
British Academy Games Awards	2026	Music	Death Stranding 2: On the Beach	Nominated	
Brussels International Animation Film Festival	2009	Best Commercial Film	Le Voyage / Balloon	Won	
Camerimage Awards	2011	Best Music Video	"Iron"	Nominated	
Camerimage Awards	2012	Best Music Video	"Blue Jeans"	Nominated	
Camerimage Awards	2013	Best Music Video	"I Love You"	Nominated	
Camerimage Awards	2014	Best Music Video	"The Golden Age"	Nominated	
Camerimage Awards	2020	Best Music Video	"Goliath"	Nominated	
Cannes Lions	2009	Best Film	Le Voyage / Balloon	Silver	
Cannes Lions	2010	Best Film	Graffiti	Bronze	
Cannes Lions	2010	Best Banner	Graffiti	Gold	
Cannes Lions	2010	Best Viral Film	Graffiti	Gold	
Cannes Lions	2010	Best Soundtrack	Graffiti	Bronze	
Cannes Lions	2016	Influencer/Talent	ANTIdiaRy	Bronze	
Cannes Lions	2016	Community Building / Management	ANTIdiaRy	Bronze	
Cannes Lions	2016	Excellence in Artist/Talent Content Production & Distribution Strategy	ANTIdiaRy	Shortlisted	
Cannes Lions	2023	Film Craft	"Reactor"	Silver	
Clubbing TV Awards	2021	Best Complextro Music Video Award	"Goliath"	Nominated	
D&AD Awards	2009	TV & Cinema Crafts / Animation	Le Voyage / Balloon	Graphite Pencil	
D&AD Awards	2011	Art Direction / Art Direction for Press Advertising	Graffiti	Wood Pencil	
D&AD Awards	2011	Film Advertising Crafts / Animation for Film Advertising	Graffiti	Wood Pencil	
D&AD Awards	2015	Music Videos / Special Effects for Music Videos	"Jewels"	Wood Pencil	
D&AD Awards	2021	Music Videos / Visual Effects	"Goliath"	Wood Pencil	
D&AD Awards	2021	Music Videos / Concept	"Goliath"	Shortlisted	
D&AD Awards	2021	Music Videos / Cinematography	"Goliath"	Shortlisted	
D&AD Awards	2023	Animation / 3D Digital	"Reactor"	Graphite Pencil	
D&AD Awards	2023	Music Videos / Visual Effects	"Reactor"	Wood Pencil	
D&AD Awards	2023	Music Videos / Animated	"Reactor"	Shortlisted	
Eurobest European Advertising Festival	2010	Best Film	Graffiti	Bronze	
European Festival Awards	2014	Newcomer of the Year	Woodkid	Nominated	
Festival International du Film Francophone de Namur	2011	Best Music Video / Prix du Meilleur Clip	"Iron"	Won	
Festival International du Film Francophone de Namur	2012	Best Music Video / Prix du Meilleur Clip	"Run Boy Run"	Won	
Film Fest Gent	2026	WSA Game Music Award	Death Stranding 2: On the Beach	Longlisted	
Fubiz Awards	2012	Fubiz Awards Music Video	"Iron"	Won	
Game Audio Network Guild Awards	2026	Best Main Theme	Death Stranding 2: On The Beach	Won	
Game Audio Network Guild Awards	2026	Best Original Song	"To the Wilder"	Nominated	
Geneva International Film Festival	2020	Film & Beyond Award	Woodkid	Won	
Grammy Awards	2013	Best Music Video	"Run Boy Run"	Nominated	
Grammy Awards	2015	Best Music Video	"The Golden Age"	Nominated	
Grammy Awards	2021	Best Music Video	"Goliath"	Nominated	
Grand Prix Stratégies de la publicité	2009	Grand Prix Stratégies	Le Voyage / Balloon	Won	
Guild of Music Supervisors Awards	2026	Best Music Supervision for a Video Game (Original Music)	Death Stranding 2: On the Beach	Won	
Havana Film Festival	2016	Best Original Music	Desierto	Won	
iHeartRadio MuchMusic Video Awards	2012	International Video of the Year by a Canadian	"Take Care"	Nominated	
Independent Music Companies Association	2014	European Independent Album of the Year	The Golden Age	Nominated	
Kinsale Shark Awards	2023	Best Animation	"Reactor"	Won	
London International Awards	2010	Digital for Viral	Graffiti	Bronze	
London International Awards	2010	Television/Cinema/Online Film for Public Service/Social Welfare	Graffiti	Bronze	
Music Moves Europe Awards	2014	European Border Breakers Awards	Woodkid	Won	
Music Moves Europe Awards	2014	Public Choice Awards	Woodkid	Nominated	
MVPA Awards	2012	Director of the Year	"Iron" & "Born to Die"	Won	
MVPA Awards	2021	Best International Video	"Goliath"	Won	
NAVGTR Awards	2026	Song, Original or Adapted	"To The Wilder"	Won	
NAVGTR Awards	2026	Original Dramatic Score, Franchise	Death Stranding 2: On the Beach	Won	
The Game Awards	2025	Best Score and Music	Death Stranding 2: On the Beach	Nominated	
The One Show Awards	2010	Online Films And Video / Short Form - Single	Graffiti	Merit	
The One Show Awards	2011	Online Films And Video / Public Service/ Non-Profit - Single	Graffiti	Merit	
The One Show Awards	2017	Gaming	ANTIdiaRy	Gold	
The One Show Awards	2017	Digital / App Design	ANTIdiaRy	Merit	
The One Show Awards	2017	Mobile / User Experience	ANTIdiaRy	Merit	
UK Music Video Awards	2011	Best Pop Video – International	"Iron"	Nominated	
UK Music Video Awards	2011	Best Styling in a Video	"Iron"	Nominated	
UK Music Video Awards	2011	Best Visual Effects in a Video	"Iron"	Nominated	
UK Music Video Awards	2012	Best Indie/Rock Video – International	"Run Boy Run"	Nominated	
UK Music Video Awards	2012	Best Visual Effects in a Video	"Run Boy Run"	Won	
UK Music Video Awards	2012	Best Pop Video – International	"Born to Die"	Won	
UK Music Video Awards	2012	Best Pop Video – International	"Blue Jeans"	Nominated	
UK Music Video Awards	2013	Best Cinematography in a Video	"I Love You"	Nominated	
UK Music Video Awards	2014	Best Cinematography in a Video	"The Golden Age"	Nominated	
UK Music Video Awards	2016	Best Urban Video – International	"High School Never Ends"	Nominated	
UK Music Video Awards	2016	Best Styling in a Video	"High School Never Ends"	Nominated	
UK Music Video Awards	2020	Best Alternative Video – International	"Goliath"	Nominated	
UK Music Video Awards	2020	Best Color Grading in a Video	"Goliath"	Nominated	
UK Music Video Awards	2020	Best Visual Effects in a Video	"Goliath"	Nominated	
Victoires de la Musique	2014	Révélation Scène	Woodkid	Won	
Victoires de la Musique	2014	Création Audiovisuelle/Clip	"I Love You"	Nominated	
Victoires de la Musique	2021	Création Audiovisuelle/Clip	"Goliath"	Nominated	
Victoires de la Musique	2022	Concert	Woodkid	Nominated	
