= Molly Cesanek =

American ice dancer

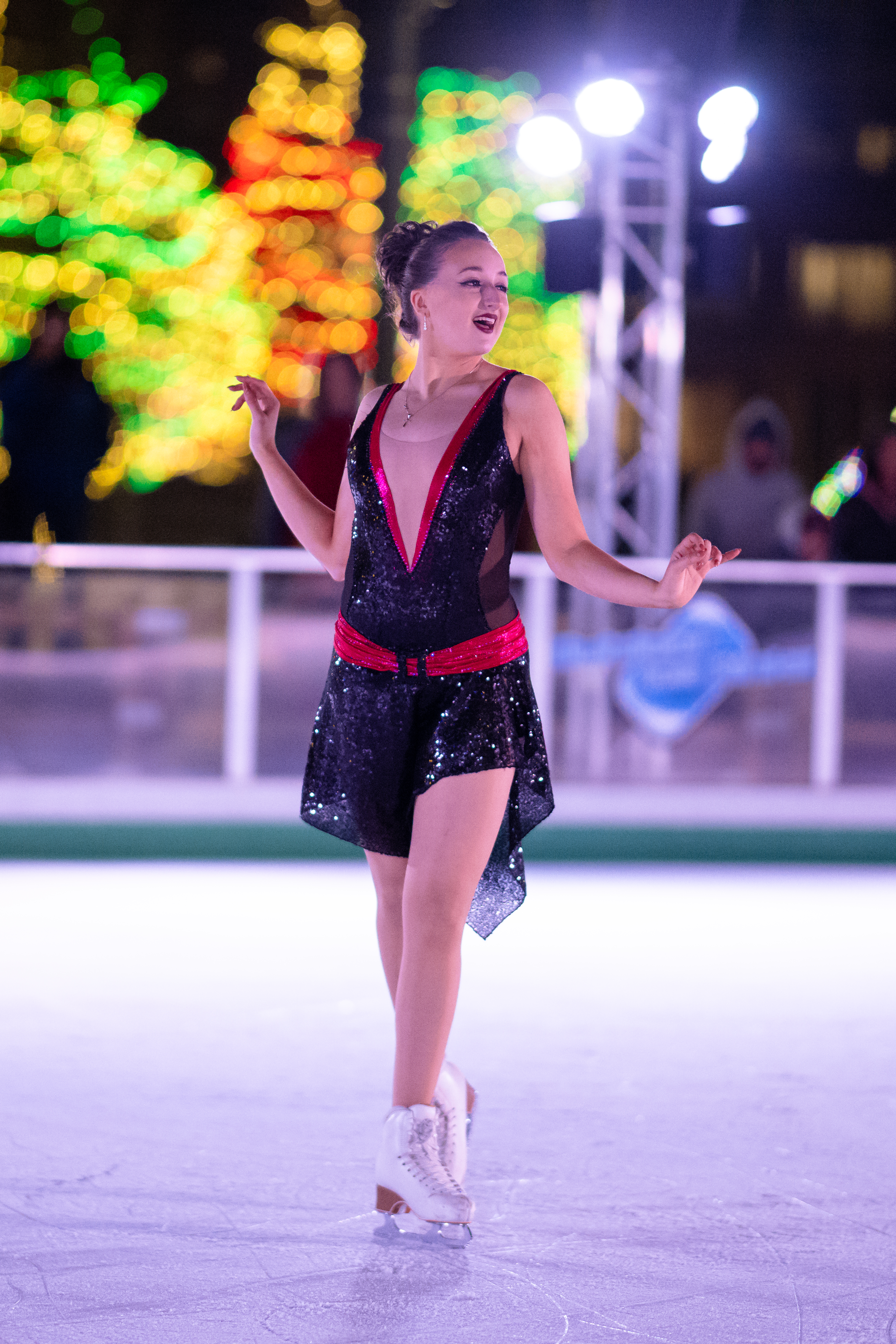

Personal information
- Born: March 2, 2001 (age 25) Manassas, Virginia, U.S.
- Home town: Warrenton, Virginia, U.S.
- Height: 5 ft 2 in (1.58 m)

Figure skating career
- Country: United States
- Partner: Yehor Yehorov
- Coach: Charlie White, Tanith Belbin, Greg Zuerlein
- Skating club: ION Figure Skating Club
- Began skating: 2006

Molly Cesanek (born March 2, 2001) is an American ice dancer. With her skating partner, Yehor Yehorov, she is the 2021 Lake Placid Ice Dance International bronze medalist and has competed on the Grand Prix series.

== Personal life ==
Cesanek was born in Manassas, Virginia, and was raised in Warrenton, Virginia. She began taking ballet lessons at age three. After graduating in 2019 from Wakefield School, she began studying health promotion at American University.

== Career ==
=== Early years ===
Cesanek began learning to skate as a five-year-old. At age 11 or 12, she took up solo ice dancing and met her first partner. With Maxwell Gart, she won silver in the juvenile competition at the 2014 U.S. Championships and bronze in the intermediate category at the 2015 U.S. Championships. She then skated one season with Edward Jahoda, placing fifth in the novice event at the 2016 U.S. Championships.

Later in 2016, Cesanek formed a partnership with Nikolay Usanov. The two would finish 7th in novice ice dancing at the 2017 U.S. Championships and 12th as juniors at the 2018 U.S. Championships.

=== Partnership with Yehorov ===
Cesanek teamed up with Ukraine's Yehor Yehorov in April 2018. During the first two seasons of their partnership, they trained at the Rockville Ice Arena in Maryland. In their first season, they placed 5th in the junior event at the 2019 U.S. Championships. Ukraine then released him to compete internationally for the United States.

Continuing in juniors the following season, Cesanek/Yehorov took bronze at the Lake Placid Ice Dance International and received two ISU Junior Grand Prix assignments, finishing 6th at both. They were awarded the pewter medal for fourth place at the 2020 U.S. Championships and won gold at the Egna Dance Trophy in February.

Ahead of the 2020–21 season, their first in the senior ranks, Cesanek/Yehorov switched to the Ion International Training Center in Leesburg, Virginia but kept the same coaching team. The duo resumed on-ice training in June after three months away due to COVID-related closures. In October, they finished 5th at the 2020 Skate America, a Grand Prix event which, due to COVID, was limited to American and U.S.-based skaters. They were also 5th at the 2021 U.S. Championships.

In August 2021, Cesanek/Yehorov won bronze at the Lake Placid Ice Dance International. After finishing 13th at the 2021 CS Lombardia Trophy and 9th at the 2021 Skate America, they placed 6th at the 2021 CS Golden Spin of Zagreb.

== Programs ==
=== With Yehorov ===
Season	Rhythm dance	Free dance	Exhibition
2022–2023	Rhumba: Temptation by Diana Krall; Mambo: Fever; Salsa: Fever performed by La Lupe choreo. by Charlie White, Tanith Belbin, Greg Zuerlein	Spartacus by Aram Khachaturian choreo. by Charlie White, Tanith Belbin, Greg Zuerlein	
2021–2022	Uptown Funk by Bruno Mars; Partition by Beyoncé; 24K Magic by Bruno Mars; 24K Magic (remix) by Power Music Workout	The Wisp Sings by Winter Aid; You Are a Memory by Message to Bears; The Passionate Love I Can't Live Without by Karl Hugo; Quote by Mark Sloan in Grey's Anatomy; Quote by William Parish in Meet Joe Black recorded by Hugo Chouinard	
2020–2021	Shout from Ain't Too Proud by original Broadway cast; Walking on Sunshine from Walking on Sunshine	Make It Rain by Foy Vance performed by Matt McAndrew; Take Me to Church by Hozier performed by Matt McAndrew	
2019–2020	My One and Only; Nice Work If You Can Get It; Overture; I Can't Be Bothered Now by George Gershwin, Ira Gershwin	Make It Rain by Foy Vance performed by Matt McAndrew; Take Me to Church by Hozier performed by Matt McAndrew	
2018–2019	Más Allá del Sur; La Dueda Interna by Tanghetto	Medley by Roger Scannura and Ritmo Flamenco	

=== With Usanov ===
Season	Short dance	Free dance
2017–2018	Amor Y Cha Cha Cha; Tanto è Solo Un Gioco by Gianni Morandi	Romeo & Juliet; The Cheek of Night; Come, Gentle Night; Forbidden Love by Abel Korzeniowski

== Competitive highlights ==
GP: Grand Prix; CS: Challenger Series; JGP: Junior Grand Prix

=== With Yehorov ===
International
Event	18–19	19–20	20–21	21–22	22–23
GP Skate America			5th	9th	
GP Skate Canada					9th
CS Golden Spin				6th	
CS Ice Challenge					5th
CS Lombardia Trophy				13th	
CS Nebelhorn					10th
Lake Placid IDI				3rd	
International: Junior
JGP Croatia		6th			
JGP Latvia		6th			
Egna Trophy		1st			
Lake Placid IDI		3rd			
National
U.S. Championships	5th J	4th J	5th	10th	WD
U.S. Ice Dance Final		2nd J			

=== With Usanov ===
National
Event	2017–18
U.S. Championships	12th J
