= Zuerlein =

Zuerlein is a surname. Notable people with the surname include:

- Greg Zuerlein (born 1987), American football player
- Greg Zuerlein (figure skater) (born 1988), American figure skater and coach
