= Yehor Yehorov =

American ice dancer (born 1999)

Personal information
- Native name: Єгор Єгоров
- Born: August 17, 1999 (age 27) Brovary, Ukraine
- Height: 6 ft 0 in (1.83 m)

Figure skating career
- Country: United States
- Partner: Molly Cesanek
- Coach: Charlie White, Tanith Belbin, Greg Zuerlein
- Skating club: Peninsula FSC San Francisco
- Began skating: 2006

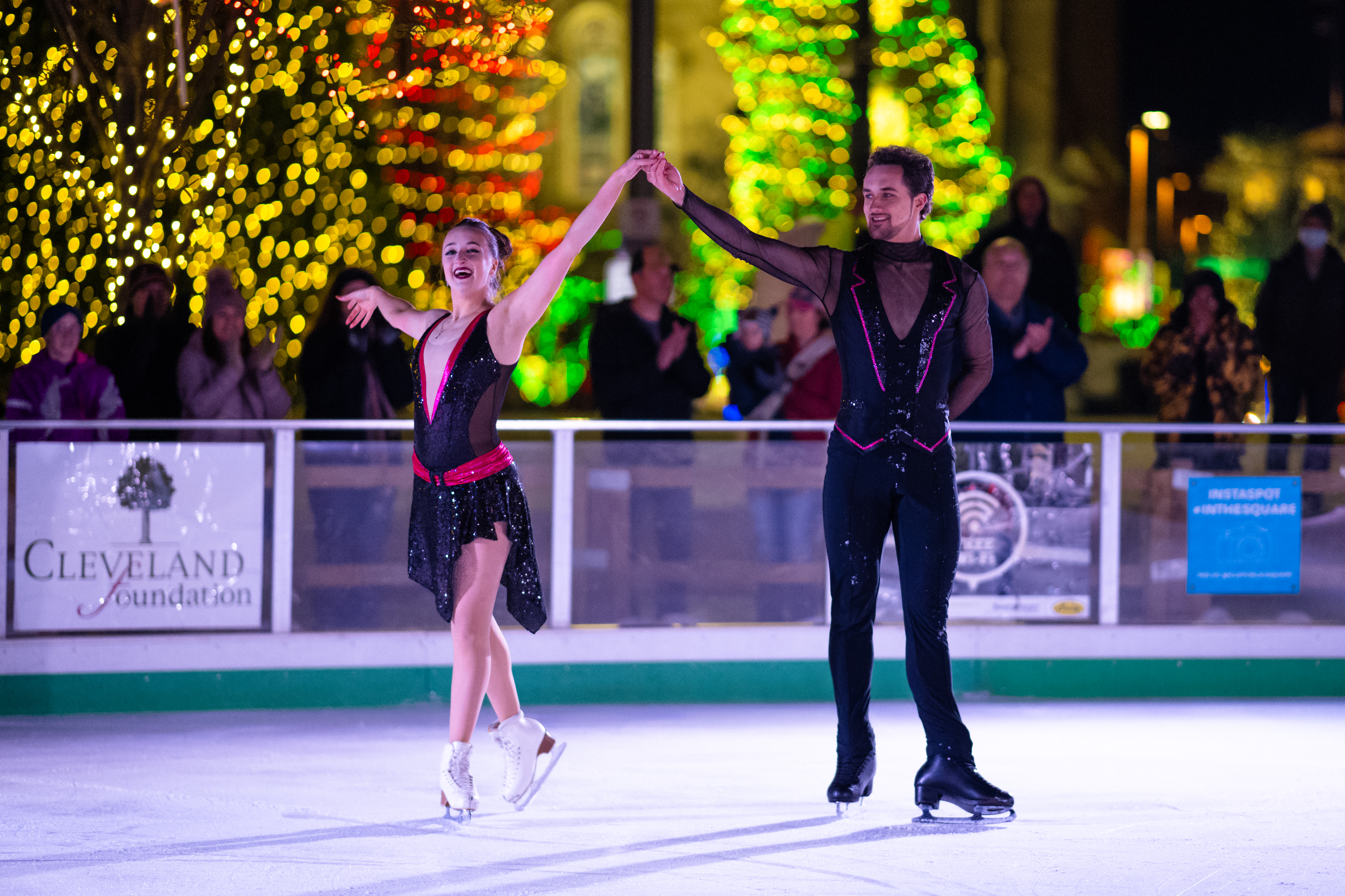
Yehor Yehorov ice skating with his partner Molly Cesanek

Yehor Yehorov (Note: Ukrainian: Єгор Єгоров, romanized: Yehor Yehorov) (born August 17, 1999) is an ice dancer. Competing for the United States with his skating partner, Molly Cesanek, he is the 2021 Lake Placid Ice Dance International bronze medalist and has competed on the Grand Prix series.

== Personal life ==
Yehorov was born August 17, 1999, in Brovary, Ukraine. He moved to the United States in 2018.

== Career ==
=== Early years ===
Yehorov became interested in skating after noticing an ice rink near his school when he was in first grade and switched from singles to ice dancing when he was 14.

Early in his career, he competed with Anhelina Sinkevych for Ukraine. Coached by Maria Tumanovska and Yevhen Kholoniuk in Kyiv, the duo made their ISU Junior Grand Prix (JGP) debut in September 2014, placing 11th in Japan. The following season, Sinkevych/Yehorov finished 9th at their JGP assignment in Colorado Springs, Colorado. They were coached by Evgeni Platov in New Jersey. After their partnership ended, he skated with Russia's Alexandra Pletneva, but the two made no competitive appearances together.

In 2017, Yehorov represented Ukraine with Olha Hihlava (also transliterated Olga Giglava). The duo competed at two JGP events, placing 7th in Austria and 11th in Croatia, and won medals at the Halloween Cup in Hungary and Bosphorus Cup in Turkey. They were coached by Natalia Vorobieva in Kyiv.

=== Partnership with Cesanek ===
Yehorov teamed up with American ice dancer Molly Cesanek in April 2018. During the first two seasons of their partnership, they trained at the Rockville Ice Arena in Maryland. In their first season, they placed 5th in the junior event at the 2019 U.S. Championships. Ukraine then released him to compete internationally for the United States.

Continuing in juniors the following season, Cesanek/Yehorov took bronze at the Lake Placid Ice Dance International and received two ISU Junior Grand Prix assignments, finishing 6th at both. They were awarded the pewter medal for fourth place at the 2020 U.S. Championships and won gold at the Egna Dance Trophy in February.

Ahead of the 2020–21 season, their first in the senior ranks, Cesanek/Yehorov switched to the Ion International Training Center in Leesburg, Virginia but kept the same coaching team. The duo resumed on-ice training in June after three months away due to COVID-related closures. In October, they finished 5th at the 2020 Skate America, a Grand Prix event which, due to COVID, was limited to American and U.S.-based skaters. They were also 5th at the 2021 U.S. Championships.

In August 2021, Cesanek/Yehorov won bronze at the Lake Placid Ice Dance International. After finishing 13th at the 2021 CS Lombardia Trophy and 9th at the 2021 Skate America, they placed 6th at the 2021 CS Golden Spin of Zagreb.

== Programs ==
=== With Cesanek ===
Season	Rhythm dance	Free dance	Exhibition
2022–2023	Rhumba: Temptation by Diana Krall; Mambo: Fever; Salsa: Fever performed by La Lupe choreo. by Charlie White, Tanith Belbin, Greg Zuerlein	Spartacus by Aram Khachaturian choreo. by Charlie White, Tanith Belbin, Greg Zuerlein	
2021–2022	Uptown Funk by Bruno Mars; Partition by Beyoncé; 24K Magic by Bruno Mars; 24K Magic (remix) by Power Music Workout	The Wisp Sings by Winter Aid; You Are a Memory by Message to Bears; The Passionate Love I Can't Live Without by Karl Hugo; Quote by Mark Sloan in Grey's Anatomy; Quote by William Parish in Meet Joe Black recorded by Hugo Chouinard	
2020–2021	Shout from Ain't Too Proud by original Broadway cast; Walking on Sunshine from Walking on Sunshine	Make It Rain by Foy Vance performed by Matt McAndrew; Take Me to Church by Hozier performed by Matt McAndrew	
2019–2020	My One and Only; Nice Work If You Can Get It; Overture; I Can't Be Bothered Now by George Gershwin, Ira Gershwin	Make It Rain by Foy Vance performed by Matt McAndrew; Take Me to Church by Hozier performed by Matt McAndrew	
2018–2019	Más Allá del Sur; La Dueda Interna by Tanghetto	Medley by Roger Scannura and Ritmo Flamenco	

=== With Hihlava ===
Season	Short dance	Free dance
2017–2018	Cha Cha: Bésame Mucho performed by Michael Bolton; Rhumba: Shall We Dance by John Altman; Mambo: Can I Tico Tico You by Zequinha de Abreu, Lou Bega	Daydreams by Abel Korzeniowski; Adjustment Bureau; Akkadian Empire by Audiomachine

=== With Sinkevych ===
Season	Short dance	Free dance
2015–2016	Waltz: Tausend und eine Nacht by Johann Strauss II	Slumdog Millionaire by A. R. Rahman
2014–2015	Mas que nada; Mambo Tonight; Aggressive Samba	Roméo et Juliette by Gérard Presgurvic

== Competitive highlights ==
GP: Grand Prix; CS: Challenger Series; JGP: Junior Grand Prix

=== With Cesanek for the United States ===
International
Event	18–19	19–20	20–21	21–22	22–23
GP Skate America			5th	9th	
GP Skate Canada					9th
CS Golden Spin				6th	
CS Ice Challenge					5th
CS Lombardia Trophy				13th	
CS Nebelhorn					10th
Lake Placid IDI				3rd	
International: Junior
JGP Croatia		6th			
JGP Latvia		6th			
Egna Trophy		1st			
Lake Placid IDI		3rd			
National
U.S. Championships	5th J	4th J	5th	10th	WD
U.S. Ice Dance Final		2nd J			

=== With Hihlava for Ukraine ===
International: Junior
Event	2016–17	2017–18
JGP Austria		7th
JGP Croatia		11th
Bosphorus Cup		1st
Halloween Cup		2nd
National
Ukrainian Junior Champ.	3rd	

=== With Sinkevych for Ukraine ===
International: Junior
Event	2014–15	2015–16
JGP Japan	11th	
JGP United States		9th
NRW Trophy	5th	
Toruń Cup	10th	
