= Katarina Wolfkostin =

American ice dancer (born 2004)

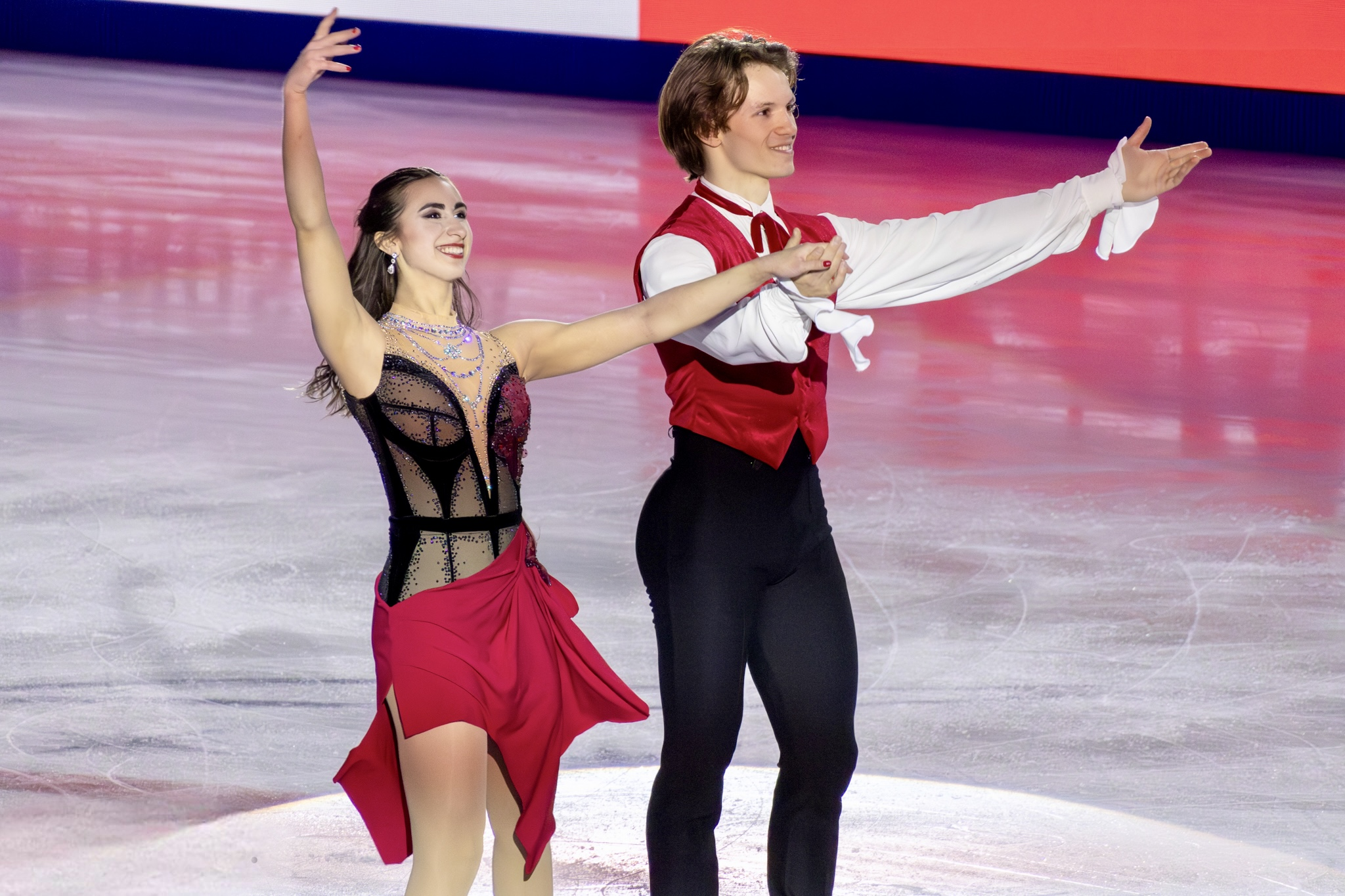
- Katarina Wolfkostin and Dimitry Tsarevski at the 2024–25 Junior Grand Prix Final

Personal information
- Full name: Katarina Patricia Wolfkostin
- Born: October 9, 2004 (age 22) Ann Arbor, Michigan, U.S.
- Height: 5 ft 5 in (1.64 m)

Figure skating career
- Country: United States
- Discipline: Ice dance
- Partner: Dimitry Tsarevski (since 2023); Jeffrey Chen (2019–23); Howard Zhao (2016–19)
- Coach: Tanith White; Greg Zuerlein; Brooke O'Keefe
- Skating club: Peninsula Skating Club
- Began skating: 2009

Medal record
Winter Youth Olympics
Bronze medal – third place	2020 Lausanne	Ice dance
World Junior Championships
Silver medal – second place	2025 Debrecen	Ice dance
Junior Grand Prix Final
Silver medal – second place	2024–25 Grenoble	Ice dance

Katarina Wolfkostin (born October 9, 2004) is an American ice dancer. Together with her partner Dimitry Tsarevski, she is the 2025 CS Lombardia Trophy bronze medalist.

On the junior level, they are the 2025 World Junior silver medalists, 2024–25 Junior Grand Prix Final silver medalist, the 2024 JGP Poland champions, and the 2024 JGP Czech Republic silver medalists.

With her former partner Jeffrey Chen, Wolfkostin was an alternate at the 2022 Winter Olympics in Beijing, the 2022 CS Budapest Trophy bronze medalist, the 2021 U.S. junior national champion, the 2021 French JGP champion, the 2021 JGP Slovenia silver medalist, and the 2020 Winter Youth Olympics bronze medalist. Prior to this, Wolfkostin was the national champion at both the 2018 U.S. Novice Championship and the 2017 U.S. Intermediate Championship, with Howard Zhao.

== Personal life ==
Wolfkostin was born on October 9, 2004, in Ann Arbor, Michigan. She has two siblings.

Outside of figure skating, she enjoys art, music, and drawing animals and fantasy creatures. She has three cats, a corn snake, and two pet cockatiels named Chika and Shirley.

In 2021, Wolfkostin was honored with the U.S. Figure Skating Athlete Alumni Ambassador (3A) award, a national award in recognition for her volunteer work in Ann Arbor.

Wolfkostin currently attends the University of Michigan, where she is majoring in kinesiology.

== Career ==
=== Early career ===
Wolfkostin began ice skating in 2009 when she was five. She started ice dancing with a partner when she was nine, training in Canton, Michigan, with Marina Zoueva. Wolfkostin and her first partner, John Carlson, placed eighth at the 2016 U.S. Championships in the intermediate division. She teamed up with Howard Zhao in the 2016–17 season. Coached by Anjelika Krylova and Pasquale Camerlengo, Wolfkostin/Zhao were the 2017 U.S. national intermediate champions, and the 2018 U.S. national novice champions, in ice dance. Wolfkostin/Zhao placed fourth in the advanced novice division at the 2018 Mentor Toruń Cup.

=== 2018–2019 season ===
Wolfkostin/Zhao placed tenth at their first-ever Junior Grand Prix event, 2018 JGP Czech Republic. They won the bronze medal at the 2018–19 Pacific Coast Sectionals to advance to the 2019 U.S. Championships, where they finished ninth. Wolfkostin/Zhao split following the end of the season.

=== 2019–2020 season: Youth Olympics bronze ===
Wolfkostin/Chen at the 2020 Winter Youth Olympics

Wolfkostin began skating with Jeffrey Chen in 2019, and he moved to train with her coaches, Igor Shpilband and Pasquale Camerlengo, in Novi, Michigan. They placed fifth in their international debut at 2019 JGP France. Wolfkostin/Chen improved to fourth at 2019 JGP Russia after placing second in the free dance. They won the inaugural U.S. Ice Dance Final to qualify for the 2020 U.S. Championships. Wolfkostin/Chen won their first international medal at the 2019 Golden Spin of Zagreb, earning the silver medal behind Ushakova/Nekrasov of Russia.

Wolfkostin/Chen were named as the sole ice dance entrant on the U.S. team for the 2020 Winter Youth Olympics. They were fifth after the rhythm dance, before placing third in the free dance, to win the bronze medal overall behind Russian dancers Khavronina/Cirisano and Tyutyunina/Shustitsky. Their medal was the first won by Team USA at the 2020 Winter Youth Olympics. Wolfkostin/Chen were drawn as part of Team Determination for the team event, alongside singles skaters Cha Young-hyun of South Korea and Nella Pelkonen of Finland and pairs skaters Brooke McIntosh / Brandon Toste of Canada. They placed fourth in the free dance segment to help Team Determination finish fourth after losing the tie-breaker.

Wolfkostin/Chen placed fourth in the rhythm dance and second in the free dance to win the silver medal at the 2020 U.S. Championships, behind Nguyen/Kolesnik. Assigned to compete at their first World Junior Championships, they placed seventh.

=== 2020–2021 season ===
The season was shortened due to the COVID-19 pandemic, with domestic competitions initially changed to a virtual format, leading up to the 2021 U.S. Championships. Wolfkostin/Chen placed first in the rhythm dance and first in the free dance in both rounds of the 2020 Virtual ISP Points Challenge, and second in the free dance at the 2020 Virtual U.S. Championship Series. Wolfkostin/Chen then competed at the 2021 U.S. Championships, after Chen was medically cleared to skate after a second opinion was obtained following a knee injury, originally thought to be an incapacitating ACL tear. Despite the injury, they placed first in both the rhythm and free dance, earning them the gold medal for the national title.

=== 2021–2022 season ===
Returning to international competition for the first time in over a year, Wolfkostin/Chen began on the Junior Grand Prix by competing at the first French JGP of 2021, in Courchevel. They placed first in both segments, easily winning the gold medal. At their second event, 2021 JGP Slovenia, they placed third in the rhythm dance but made up ground in the free dance, placing second in that segment and placed second overall. Assigned to their first senior event just a few weeks later, Wolfkostin/Chen placed ninth at the 2021 CS Cup of Austria. Their JGP results had qualified them for the 2021–22 Junior Grand Prix Final, but it was subsequently canceled as a result of travel restrictions prompted by the COVID-19 Omicron variant.

Rather than seeking to defend their national junior title, Wolfkostin/Chen opted to compete as seniors at the 2022 U.S. Championships. They finished in sixth place overall, notably beating former national pewter medalists Carreira/Ponomarenko. When the U.S. team was announced for the 2022 Winter Olympics in Beijing, Wolfkostin/Chen were named as alternates.

Due to the pandemic, the 2022 World Junior Championships could not be held as scheduled in Sofia in early March and, as a result, were rescheduled for Tallinn in mid-April. Due to Vladimir Putin's invasion of Ukraine, the International Skating Union (ISU) banned all Russian and Belarusian athletes from participating, which had a significant impact on the field of figure skating and ice dance. Wolfkostin/Chen were considered frontrunners for the title, however, following a fall at the beginning of the rhythm dance, they placed ninth in that segment, 6.40 points behind third place Bashynska/Beaumont of Canada. Wolfkostin/Chen mounted a comeback in the free dance, placing second in that segment with a score within 0.04 points of their personal best, which raised them to fourth place overall. They finished 0.37 points back of bronze medalists Bashynska/Beaumont.

=== 2022–2023 season ===
Despite their disappointing result at the World Junior Championships, it did not alter Wolfkostin and Chen's plans to move up to the senior level for the following season. Chen would later explain their reasoning that "we had already competed a bit in seniors last year, and we were excited to move into seniors. We feel that it's inspiring and helps us grow faster. It also relieves a bit of pressure; being the ones who chase after people, instead of being targeted." In addition, Wolfkostin and Chen announced in May that they would be leaving coach Igor Shpilband to train at the new Michigan Ice Dance Academy in Canton, Michigan, under coaches Greg Zuerlein, Tanith Belbin White, and Olympic champion Charlie White. This also aligned with their mutual decision to attend the nearby University of Michigan in Ann Arbor.

The team debuted new senior programs at the 2022 Lake Placid Ice Dance International, where they won the bronze medal. Shortly afterward, they appeared on the Challenger series at the 2022 CS U.S. Classic, finishing sixth. At their second Challenger, the 2022 CS Budapest Trophy, Wolfkostin/Chen won the bronze medal, setting three new personal bests in the process. In November, they were invited to make their senior Grand Prix debut, finishing in eighth place at the 2022 Grand Prix de France. They were tenth at the 2022 NHK Trophy, struggling with level issues on several elements. Chen later said that illness and a training injury had hindered them during the Grand Prix. At the 2023 U.S. Championships, they placed tenth in the rhythm dance and fifth in the free dance, resulting in a seventh-place finish overall.

On February 8, 2023, Wolfkostin and Chen announced the end of their partnership, with Wolfkostin stating that she would look for a new partner. She said that "last year had many ups and downs and I'm still trying to figure everything out." Months later, she would add that "we had different goals in mind, and just a couple things that weren't going to work out."

=== 2023–2024 season: First season with Tsarevski ===
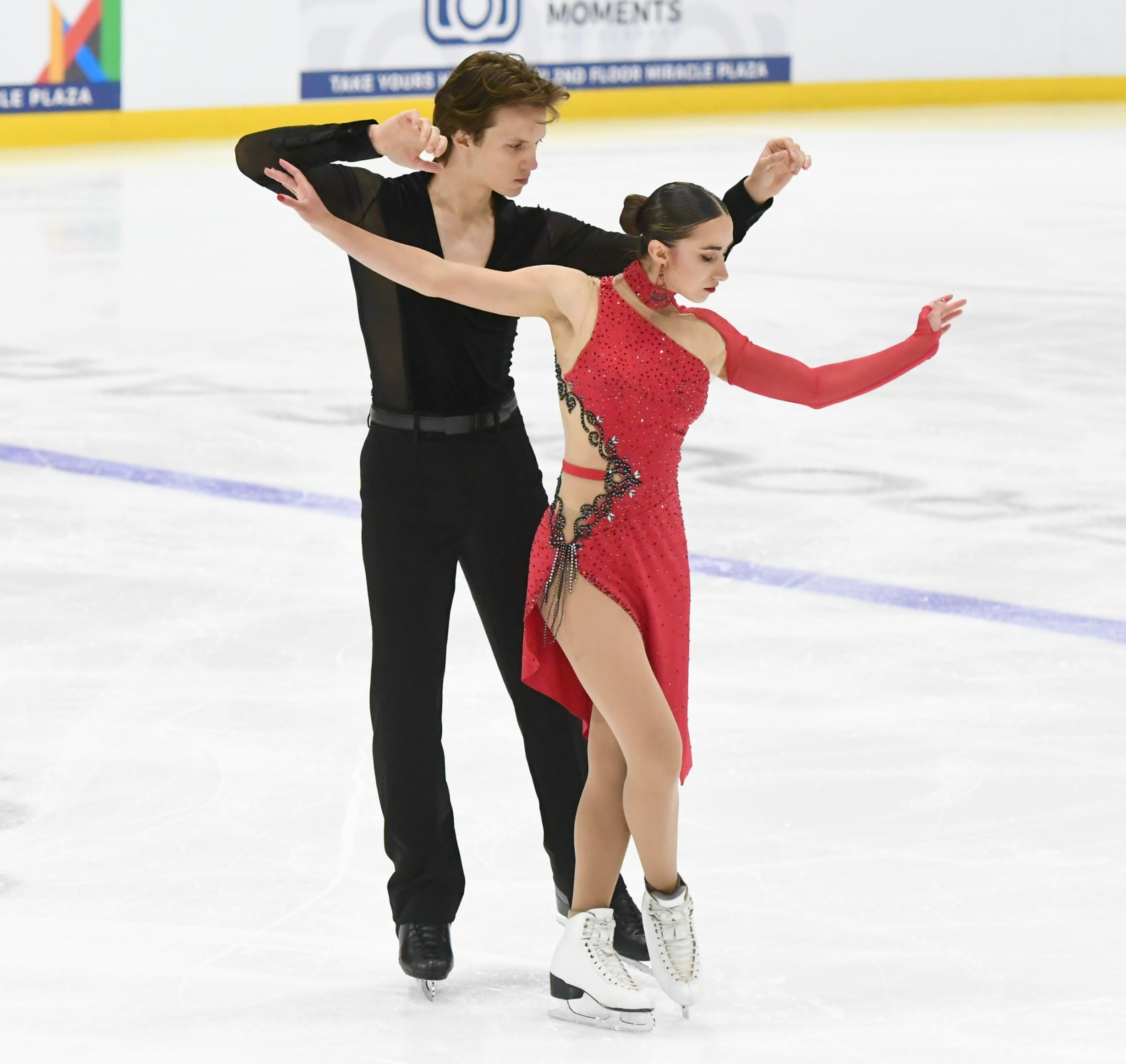
Wolfkostin/Tsarevski at the 2023 Lake Placid Ice Dance Championships

On May 16, 2023, Wolfkostin announced a new ice dance partnership with Dimitry Tsarevski, who moved from Colorado to Michigan to train with her and coaches Charlie White, Greg Zuerlein, and Tanith Belbin White. Wolfkostin/Tsarevski started their season with successful summer competitions in Dallas and Lake Placid, where they placed first in all events at the senior level. They were then given their first senior international assignment, the 2023 CS Autumn Classic International, where they placed fifth. They again placed fifth at the 2023 CS Budapest Trophy. The following month, they placed first in both segments of the senior level of the 2024 U.S. Ice Dance Final, easily winning the gold and qualifying them for the 2024 U.S. Championships. There, they placed eighth in the rhythm dance, seventh in the free dance, and ninth overall, finishing 1.38 points behind sibling team Brown/Brown.

=== 2024–2025 season: World Junior silver and Junior Grand Prix Final silver ===
In June 2024, a new ruling of the ISU Congress resulted in a change of age limit for junior pairs and ice dance teams, and Wolfkostin, 19, and Tsarevski, 20, opted to start the year in the junior division. Wolfkostin reported being off the ice for several months while recovering from a leg fracture, and they waited until July to begin their season. At the 2024 Lake Placid Ice Dance International, they placed second overall. They were then assigned to the JGP Czech Republic, where they clinched the silver medal. A few weeks later at the JGP Poland, they won the gold medal, scoring new season's bests and qualifying them for the Junior Grand Prix Final in Grenoble, France. There, Wolfkostin and Tsarevski scored 65.57 in the rhythm dance and 99.41 in the free dance, totaling 164.98 points and earning the silver medal.

Competing a "split" junior-senior season, after the conclusion of the Grand Prix, Wolfkostin and Tsarevski skated to brand new senior programs for the 2025 U.S. Championships. There, they placed sixth in the rhythm dance with a score of 76.27, and eighth in the free with a score of 110.56, for a total of 186.83 points and a seventh-place finish overall.

Following the national championships, Wolfkostin/Tsarevski completed their season at the 2025 World Junior Championships in Debrecen. Skating early in the rhythm dance segment, the team scored 65.71 points, and placed second. They then scored 101.80 points in the free dance, earning a combined total of 167.51 points, and winning the silver medal behind Italian team Tali/Lafornara.

Wolfkostin/Tsarevski at the 2026 U.S. Championships

=== 2025–2026 season: Grand Prix senior debut ===
Wolfkostin/Tsarevski opened the season by competing on the 2025–26 Challenger Series, winning bronze at the 2025 CS Lombardia Trophy and placing seventh at the 2025 CS Nepela Memorial. They then went on to make their senior Grand Prix debut at the 2025 NHK Trophy. There, they placed fifth in both the rhythm and the free dance, and fifth overall, notably beating former Olympians Maia and Alex Shibutani. In January, Wolfkostin/Tsarevski competed at the 2026 U.S. Championships, finishing in seventh place overall.

=== 2026–2027 season ===
Wolfkostin/Tsarevski opened their season by placing 11th at the 2026 Kinoshita Group Cup.

== Programs ==
=== Ice dance with Dimitry Tsarevski ===
Season	Rhythm dance	Free dance
2023–2024	Love Is a Battlefield by Pat Benatar; Call Me by Blondie choreo. by Charlie White, Greg Zuerlein, Tanith White	Tanguera by Diego Schissi Quinteto; Invierno Porteño by Astor Piazzolla performed by Gidon Kremer & Kremerata Baltica choreo. by Charlie White, Greg Zuerlein, Tanith White
2024–2025	Car Wash by Norman Whitfield performed by Christina Aguilera; Disco Inferno by The Trammps, Ron Kersey, & Leroy Green choreo. by Charlie White, Greg Zuerlein, Tanith White	Moulin Rouge!; One Day I'll Fly Away performed by Nicole Kidman; The Show Must Go On performed by Nicole Kidman, Jim Broadbent, & Anthony Weigh choreo. by Charlie White, Greg Zuerlein, Tanith White
2025–2026	Everybody (Backstreet's Back) (Extended Version) by Backstreet Boys; Quit Playing Games (with My Heart) (Remix) by Backstreet Boys & Bodybangers; Larger Than Life by Backstreet Boys choreo. by Charlie White, Tanith White, Greg Zuerlein, Krisilyn Frazier	Bang Bang (My Baby Shot Me Down) by Nancy Sinatra; Battle Without Honor or Humanity by Tomoyasu Hotei & Yoichi Murata; The Lonely Shepherd by Gheorghe Zamfir & James Last; Malagueña by Ernesto Lecuona choreo. by Charlie White, Tanith White, Greg Zuerlein, Krisilyn Frazier

=== Ice dance with Jeffrey Chen ===
Season	Rhythm dance	Free dance
2019–2020	Foxtrot: Everything Old is New Again (from The Boy from Oz) performed by Peter Allen, Carole Bayer Sager	How Will I Know performed by Sam Smith by George Merrill, Shannon Rubicam; Fire on Fire (from Watership Down) by Sam Smith
2020–2021	Foxtrot: Everything Old is New Again (from The Boy from Oz) performed by Peter Allen, Carole Bayer Sager	Exogenesis: Symphony Part III by Muse
2021–2022	Blues: Speechless/Human Nature (Immortal version); Diamonds Are Invincible; Blues: Human Nature; March: Smooth Criminal by Michael Jackson choreo. by Igor Shpilband and Pasquale Camerlengo	Rain, In Your Black Eyes by Ezio Bosso choreo. by Igor Shpilband and Pasquale Camerlengo
2022–2023	Samba: Lagoa by Watazu; Rhumba: Summer in the Ends by Juls, Jaz Karis & George the Poet; Rhumba: Hot Oil, No Sweat by Brent Lewis; Samba: Magalenha by Sérgio Mendes choreo. by Charlie White, Tanith Belbin White, Greg Zuerlein	Light of Love; Dog Days Are Over by Florence + the Machine choreo. by Charlie White, Tanith Belbin White, Greg Zuerlein

=== Ice dance with Howard Zhao ===
Season	Rhythm dance	Free dance
2016–2017		Mary Poppins
2017–2018		La La Land
2018–2019	Tango: Cirque du Soleil; Tango: Differente by Gotan Project	Doctor Zhivago by Maurice Jarre

== Competitive highlights ==
- GP – Event of the ISU Grand Prix Series
- CS – Event of the ISU Challenger Series
- JGP – Event of the ISU Junior Grand Prix Series
- TBD – Assigned
- WD – Withdrew from competition

=== Ice dance with Dimitry Tsarevski ===
Competition placements at senior level
Season	2023–24	2024–25	2025–26	2026–27
U.S. Championships	9th	7th	7th	
GP NHK Trophy			5th	
GP Skate America				4th
GP Skate Canada				6th
CS Autumn Classic	5th			
CS Budapest Trophy	5th			
CS Kinoshita Group Cup				11th
CS Lombardia Trophy			3rd	
CS Nebelhorn Trophy				6th
CS Nepela Memorial			7th	
CS Tallinn Trophy		WD		

Competition placements at junior level
Season	2024–25
World Junior Championships	2nd
Junior Grand Prix Final	2nd
JGP Czech Republic	2nd
JGP Poland	1st
Lake Placid Ice Dance	2nd

=== Ice dance with Jeffrey Chen ===
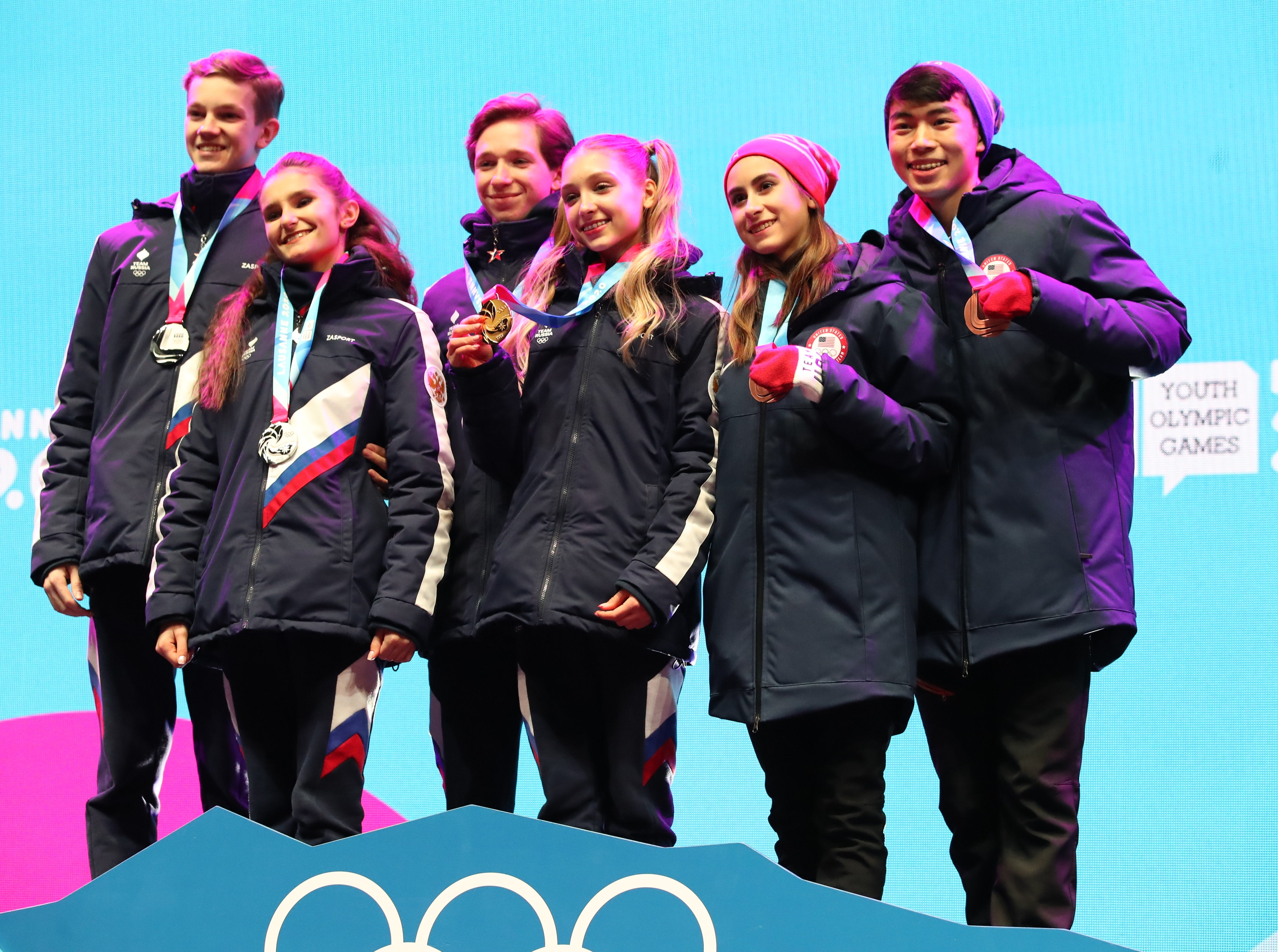
Wolfkostin/Chen (right) on the podium at the 2020 Winter Youth Olympics

Competition placements at senior level
Season	2021–22	2022–23
U.S. Championships	6th	7th
GP France		8th
GP NHK Trophy		10th
CS Budapest Trophy		3rd
CS Cup of Austria	9th	
CS U.S. Classic		6th
Lake Placid Ice Dance		3rd

Competition placements at junior level
Season	2019–20	2020–21	2021–22
Winter Youth Olympics	3rd		
Winter Youth Olympics (Team event)	4th		
World Junior Championships	7th		4th
U.S. Championships	2nd	1st	
JGP France	5th		1st
JGP Russia	4th		
JGP Slovenia			2nd
Golden Spin of Zagreb	2nd		

=== Ice dance with Howard Zhao ===
Competition placements at junior level
Season	2018–19
U.S. Championships	9th
JGP Czech Republic	10th

== Detailed results ==
=== Ice dance with Dimitry Tsarevski ===
ISU personal best scores in the +5/-5 GOE System
Segment	Type	Score	Event
Total	TSS	182.85	2025 NHK Trophy
Rhythm dance	TSS	72.12	2025 NHK Trophy
Rhythm dance	TES	41.42	2026 Skate Canada International
Rhythm dance	PCS	31.79	2025 CS Nepela Memorial
Free dance	TSS	110.73	2025 NHK Trophy
Free dance	TES	62.27	2025 CS Lombardia Trophy
Free dance	PCS	48.58	2025 NHK Trophy

==== Senior level ====
Results in the 2023–24 season
Date	Event	RD		FD		Total	
Date	Event	P	Score	P	Score	P	Score
Sep 14–17, 2023	(Canada) 2023 CS Autumn Classic International	5	66.43	4	96.91	5	163.34
Oct 13–15, 2023	(Hungary) 2023 CS Budapest Trophy	5	68.92	5	103.96	5	172.88
Jan 22–28, 2024	(United States) 2024 U.S. Championships	8	70.40	7	107.65	9	178.05

Results in the 2024–25 season
Date	Event	RD		FD		Total	
Date	Event	P	Score	P	Score	P	Score
Nov 12–17, 2024	(Estonia) 2024 CS Tallinn Trophy	6	69.28	—N/a	—N/a	–	WD
Jan 20–26, 2025	(United States) 2025 U.S. Championships	6	76.27	8	110.56	7	186.83

Results in the 2025–26 season
Date	Event	RD		FD		Total	
Date	Event	P	Score	P	Score	P	Score
Sep 11–14, 2025	(Italy) 2025 CS Lombardia Trophy	3	69.73	2	110.47	3	180.20
Sep 25–27, 2025	(Slovakia) 2025 CS Nepela Memorial	5	72.08	7	100.36	7	172.44
Nov 7–9, 2025	(Japan) 2025 NHK Trophy	5	72.12	4	110.73	5	182.85
Jan 4–11, 2026	(United States) 2026 U.S. Championships	7	74.99	7	111.61	7	186.60

Results in the 2026–27 season
Date	Event	SP		FS		Total	
Date	Event	P	Score	P	Score	P	Score
Sep 4–6, 2026	(Japan) 2026 CS Kinoshita Group Cup	12	54.31	7	98.53	11	152.84
Sep 24–26, 2026	(Germany) 2026 CS Nebelhorn Trophy	3	68.33	6	99.32	6	167.65
Oct 30 – Nov 1, 2026	2026 Skate Canada International	6	71.40	6	104.24	6	175.64
Nov 13–15, 2026	(United States) 2026 Skate America	5	69.62	4	107.41	4	177.03

==== Junior level ====
Results in the 2024–25 season
Date	Event	RD		FD		Total	
Date	Event	P	Score	P	Score	P	Score
Jul 30–31, 2024	(United States) 2024 Lake Placid Ice Dance International	3	57.03	2	92.71	2	149.74
Sep 4–7, 2024	2024 JGP Czech Republic	2	55.98	3	88.96	2	144.94
Sep 25–28, 2024	2024 JGP Poland	1	65.85	1	101.03	1	166.88
Dec 5–8, 2024	(France) 2024–25 Junior Grand Prix Final	2	65.57	2	99.41	2	164.98
Feb 25 – Mar 2, 2025	(Hungary) 2025 World Junior Championships	2	65.71	2	101.80	2	167.51

=== Ice dance with Jeffrey Chen ===
==== Senior level ====
Results in the 2021–22 season
Date	Event	RD		FD		Total	
Date	Event	P	Score	P	Score	P	Score
Nov 11–14, 2021	2021 CS Cup of Austria	10	63.04	7	101.29	9	164.33
Jan 2–9, 2022	(United States) 2022 U.S. Championships	7	75.28	6	111.99	6	187.27

Results in the 2022–23 season
Date	Event	RD		FD		Total	
Date	Event	P	Score	P	Score	P	Score
Jul 26–29, 2022	(United States) 2022 Lake Placid Ice Dance International	1	71.92	4	103.50	3	175.42
Sep 13–16, 2022	(United States) 2022 CS U.S. Classic	6	60.69	6	103.38	6	164.07
Oct 14–16, 2022	(Hungary) 2022 CS Budapest Trophy	3	72.37	3	108.09	3	180.46
Nov 4–6, 2022	2022 Grand Prix de France	7	64.18	8	100.71	8	164.89
Nov 18–20, 2022	(Japan) 2022 NHK Trophy	10	64.94	10	83.07	10	148.01
Jan 21–29, 2023	(United States) 2023 U.S. Championships	10	69.05	5	114.00	7	183.05

==== Junior level ====
Results in the 2019–20 season
Date	Event	RD		FD		Total	
Date	Event	P	Score	P	Score	P	Score
Aug 21–24, 2019	2019 JGP France	4	58.90	5	89.03	5	147.93
Sep 11–14, 2019	2019 JGP Russia	6	54.91	2	93.90	4	148.81
Dec 4–7, 2019	(Croatia) 2019 Golden Spin of Zagreb	1	66.52	2	97.29	2	163.81
Jan 11–13, 2020	(Switzerland) 2020 Winter Youth Olympics	5	57.02	3	95.41	3	152.43
Jan 15, 2020	(Switzerland) 2020 Winter Youth Olympics (Team event)	—N/a	—N/a	4	90.41	4	—N/a
Jan 20–26, 2020	(United States) 2020 U.S. Championships (Junior)	4	60.93	2	100.46	2	161.39
Mar 2–8, 2020	(Estonia) 2020 World Junior Championships	7	64.77	7	94.43	7	159.20

Results in the 2020–21 season
Date	Event	RD		FD		Total	
Date	Event	P	Score	P	Score	P	Score
Jan 11–21, 2021	(United States) 2021 U.S. Championships (Junior)	1	68.81	1	98.41	1	167.22

Results in the 2021–22 season
Date	Event	RD		FD		Total	
Date	Event	P	Score	P	Score	P	Score
Aug 18–21, 2021	2021 JGP France I	1	64.75	1	100.26	1	165.01
Sep 22–25, 2021	2021 JGP Slovenia	3	62.99	2	100.26	2	163.25
Apr 13–17, 2022	(Estonia) 2022 World Junior Championships	9	57.05	2	100.22	4	157.27

=== Ice dance with Howard Zhao ===
Results in the 2018–19 season
Date	Event	RD		FD		Total	
Date	Event	P	Score	P	Score	P	Score
Sep 26–29, 2018	2018 JGP Czech Republic	10	50.80	10	76.78	10	127.58
Jan 18–27, 2019	(United States) 2019 U.S. Championships (Junior)	9	50.07	8	77.56	9	127.63
