= 2020 Skate America =

- Type: Grand Prix
- Date: October 23 – 24
- Season: 2020–21
- Location: Las Vegas, Nevada
- Host: U.S. Figure Skating
- Venue: Orleans Arena

Champions
- Men's singles: (United States) Nathan Chen
- Ladies' singles: (United States) Mariah Bell
- Pairs: (United States) Alexa Scimeca Knierim / Brandon Frazier
- Ice dance: (United States) Madison Hubbell / Zachary Donohue
- Previous: 2019 Skate America
- Next: 2021 Skate America
- Next Grand Prix: 2020 Cup of China

The 2020 Guaranteed Rate Skate America was the first event in the 2020–21 ISU Grand Prix of Figure Skating, a senior-level international invitational competition series. It was held at Orleans Arena in Las Vegas, Nevada on October 23–24. Medals were awarded in the disciplines of men's singles, ladies' singles, pair skating, and ice dance.

Due to the ongoing COVID-19 pandemic, a large number of modifications were made to the Grand Prix structure. The competitors consisted only of skaters from the home country, skaters already training in the host nation, and skaters assigned to that event for geographic reasons.

On September 25, 2020, U.S. Figure Skating announced that Skate America would be held without spectators present, in line with Nevada Gaming Control Board guidelines regarding the pandemic. Attendees at the competition remained in a bubble throughout the duration of the event.

== Entries ==
The International Skating Union announced the preliminary assignments on October 1, 2020.

Country	Men	Ladies	Pairs	Ice dance
Canada	Keegan Messing			
China		Lin Shan		
Hungary				Emily Monaghan / Ilias Fourati
Israel	Alexei Bychenko; Daniel Samohin		Anna Vernikov / Evgeni Krasnopolski	
United States	Nathan Chen; Tomoki Hiwatashi; Joseph Kang; Alexei Krasnozhon; Jimmy Ma; Ilia Malinin; Maxim Naumov; Camden Pulkinen; Vincent Zhou	Starr Andrews; Mariah Bell; Karen Chen; Amber Glenn; Gracie Gold; Finley Hawk; Pooja Kalyan; Paige Rydberg; Audrey Shin; Bradie Tennell; Sierra Venetta	Ashley Cain-Gribble / Timothy LeDuc; Jessica Calalang / Brian Johnson; Emily Chan / Spencer Howe; Tarah Kayne / Danny O'Shea; Audrey Lu / Misha Mitrofanov; Alexa Scimeca Knierim / Brandon Frazier; Olivia Serafini / Mervin Tran	Christina Carreira / Anthony Ponomarenko; Molly Cesanek / Yehor Yehorov; Caroline Green / Michael Parsons; Kaitlin Hawayek / Jean-Luc Baker; Madison Hubbell / Zachary Donohue; Lorraine McNamara / Anton Spiridonov; Eva Pate / Logan Bye

=== Changes to preliminary assignments ===
Discipline	Withdrew		Added		Notes	Ref.
Discipline	Date	Skater(s)	Date	Skater(s)	Notes	Ref.
Pairs	—		October 5	(United States) Emily Chan / Spencer Howe		
Men	October 7	(Canada) Stephen Gogolev	October 7	(Israel) Daniel Samohin	Injury	
Ladies	October 7	(United States) Gabriella Izzo	October 7	(United States) Paige Rydberg		
Pairs	October 8	(Russia) Evgenia Tarasova / Vladimir Morozov	October 13	(Israel) Anna Vernikov / Evgeni Krasnopolski	Event conflict	
Men	October 9	(Czech Republic) Michal Březina	October 9	(United States) Joseph Kang	Injury	
Ice dance	October 9	(United States) Madison Chock / Evan Bates	—		Lack of preparation time	
Ice dance	October 9	(United States) Livvy Shilling / Alexander Petrov	—			
Ice dance	—		October 9	(Hungary) Emily Monaghan / Ilias Fourati		
Ladies	October 12	(United States) Isabelle Inthisone	October 12	(United States) Finley Hawk		
Ladies	October 12	(United States) Kate Wang	October 12	(United States) Sierra Venetta		

== Results ==
=== Men ===
Rank	Name	Nation	Total points	SP		FS	
1	Nathan Chen	United States	299.15	1	111.17	1	187.98
2	Vincent Zhou	United States	275.10	2	99.36	2	175.47
3	Keegan Messing	Canada	266.42	3	92.40	3	174.02
4	Tomoki Hiwatashi	United States	245.30	4	87.17	4	158.13
5	Ilia Malinin	United States	220.31	7	76.75	5	143.56
6	Alexei Bychenko	Israel	214.62	6	77.48	8	137.14
7	Alexei Krasnozhon	United States	214.61	5	78.06	9	136.55
8	Maxim Naumov	United States	214.27	8	70.91	6	143.36
9	Camden Pulkinen	United States	207.82	9	69.09	7	138.73
10	Jimmy Ma	United States	196.98	11	63.36	10	133.62
11	Joseph Kang	United States	192.37	10	68.08	11	124.29
12	Daniel Samohin	Israel	184.54	12	61.60	12	122.94

=== Ladies ===
Rank	Name	Nation	Total points	SP		FS	
1	Mariah Bell	United States	212.73	1	76.48	4	136.25
2	Bradie Tennell	United States	211.07	2	73.29	1	137.78
3	Audrey Shin	United States	206.15	3	69.77	3	136.38
4	Karen Chen	United States	204.90	4	68.13	2	136.77
5	Amber Glenn	United States	190.09	5	67.85	6	122.24
6	Lin Shan	China	182.11	7	59.29	5	122.84
7	Paige Rydberg	United States	178.13	6	63.91	8	114.22
8	Starr Andrews	United States	171.70	10	57.20	7	114.50
9	Sierra Venetta	United States	170.12	8	59.28	9	111.44
10	Pooja Kalyan	United States	158.95	11	55.50	10	103.45
11	Finley Hawk	United States	154.25	9	59.12	11	95.13
12	Gracie Gold	United States	127.82	12	46.36	12	81.46

=== Pairs ===
Rank	Name	Nation	Total points	SP		FS	
1	Alexa Scimeca Knierim / Brandon Frazier	United States	214.77	1	74.19	1	140.58
2	Jessica Calalang / Brian Johnson	United States	207.40	2	71.08	2	136.32
3	Audrey Lu / Misha Mitrofanov	United States	189.65	3	67.52	4	122.13
4	Ashley Cain-Gribble / Timothy LeDuc	United States	189.23	4	64.21	3	125.02
5	Tarah Kayne / Danny O'Shea	United States	174.35	5	59.86	5	114.49
6	Olivia Serafini / Mervin Tran	United States	168.07	6	59.67	6	108.40
7	Emily Chan / Spencer Howe	United States	151.15	7	55.58	8	95.57
8	Anna Vernikov / Evgeni Krasnopolski	Israel	146.12	8	48.23	7	97.89

=== Ice dance ===
Rank	Name	Nation	Total points	RD		FD	
1	Madison Hubbell / Zachary Donohue	United States	211.39	1	85.30	1	126.09
2	Kaitlin Hawayek / Jean-Luc Baker	United States	202.47	2	81.15	2	121.32
3	Christina Carreira / Anthony Ponomarenko	United States	185.78	3	78.63	3	107.15
4	Caroline Green / Michael Parsons	United States	178.05	4	74.98	4	103.07
5	Molly Cesanek / Yehor Yehorov	United States	168.09	5	66.01	5	102.08
6	Lorraine McNamara / Anton Spiridonov	United States	159.89	6	63.50	6	96.39
7	Eva Pate / Logan Bye	United States	151.40	7	59.61	7	91.79
8	Emily Monaghan / Ilias Fourati	Hungary	127.70	8	54.88	8	72.82
