= Tanith Belbin White =

Canadian-American ice dancer (born 1984)

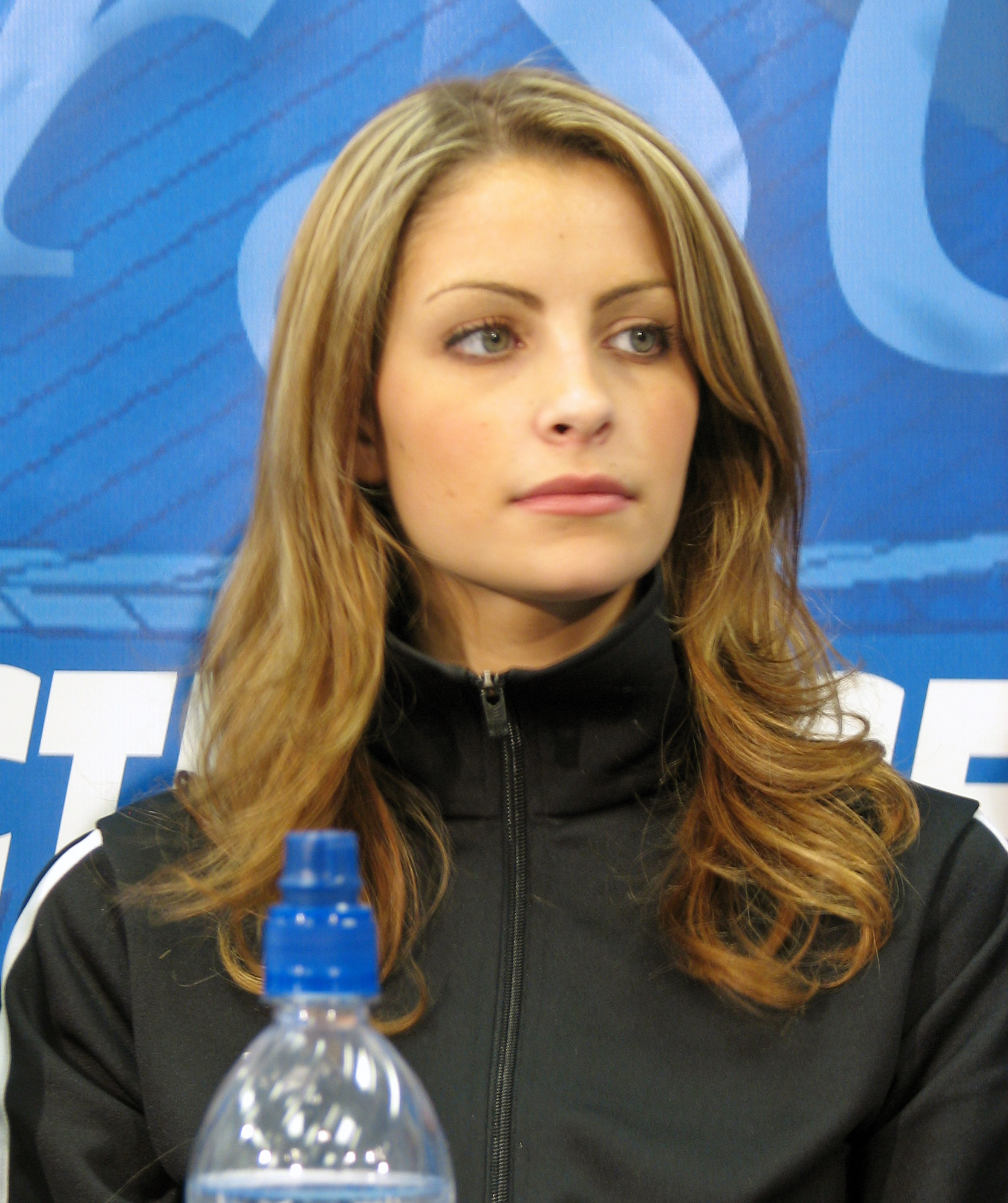
- Belbin in 2006

Personal information
- Full name: Tanith Jessica Louise Belbin
- Born: July 11, 1984 (age 42) Kingston, Ontario, Canada
- Height: 5 ft 6 in (1.67 m)

Figure skating career
- Country: United States
- Partner: Benjamin Agosto
- Skating club: IceWorks
- Began skating: 1986
- Retired: June 13, 2010
Event	Gold medal – first place	Silver medal – second place	Bronze medal – third place
Olympic Games	0	1	0
World Championships	0	2	2
Four Continents Championships	3	3	0
Grand Prix Final	0	2	1
U.S. Championships	5	4	0
World Team Trophy	1	0	0
World Junior Championships	1	1	1
Junior Grand Prix Final	1	0	0
Medal list
Olympic Games
Silver medal – second place	2006 Turin	Ice dance
World Championships
Silver medal – second place	2005 Moscow	Ice dance
Silver medal – second place	2009 Los Angeles	Ice dance
Bronze medal – third place	2006 Calgary	Ice dance
Bronze medal – third place	2007 Tokyo	Ice dance
Four Continents Championships
Gold medal – first place	2004 Hamilton	Ice dance
Gold medal – first place	2005 Gangneung	Ice dance
Gold medal – first place	2006 Colorado Springs	Ice dance
Silver medal – second place	2002 Jeonju	Ice dance
Silver medal – second place	2003 Beijing	Ice dance
Silver medal – second place	2007 Colorado Springs	Ice dance
Grand Prix Final
Silver medal – second place	2004–05 Beijing	Ice dance
Silver medal – second place	2007–08 Turin	Ice dance
Bronze medal – third place	2003–04 Colorado Springs	Ice dance
U.S. Championships
Gold medal – first place	2004 Atlanta	Ice dance
Gold medal – first place	2005 Portland	Ice dance
Gold medal – first place	2006 St. Louis	Ice dance
Gold medal – first place	2007 Spokane	Ice dance
Gold medal – first place	2008 St. Paul	Ice dance
Silver medal – second place	2001 Boston	Ice dance
Silver medal – second place	2002 Los Angeles	Ice dance
Silver medal – second place	2003 Dallas	Ice dance
Silver medal – second place	2010 Spokane	Ice dance
World Team Trophy
Gold medal – first place	2009 Tokyo	Team
World Junior Championships
Gold medal – first place	2002 Hamar	Ice dance
Silver medal – second place	2001 Sofia	Ice dance
Bronze medal – third place	2000 Oberstdorf	Ice dance
Junior Grand Prix Final
Gold medal – first place	2000–01 Ayr	Ice dance

Tanith Jessica Louise Belbin White (born July 11, 1984) is a Canadian-American ice dancer and Olympic program host for NBC Sports. Though born in Canada, she holds dual citizenship and has competed for the United States since she began skating with Benjamin Agosto in 1998. With Agosto, Belbin is the 2006 Olympic silver medalist, four-time World medalist, three-time Four Continents champion (2004–2006), and five-time U.S. champion (2004–2008).

== Personal life ==
Tanith Belbin was born in Kingston, Ontario, and raised in Kirkland, Quebec. In 1998, she moved to the Detroit area in the United States and received an immigrant worker visa in 2000. Due to immigration rules at the time, she did not receive a green card until July 2002 and would not have been granted U.S. citizenship until 2007. An amendment was passed which allowed Belbin to be sworn in as an American citizen on December 31, 2005. The amendment was authored by Senator Carl Levin who stated, "This amendment corrects an anomaly in the law that unfairly disadvantaged some people who had begun their naturalization process before 2002. Tanith Belbin began her naturalization process in 2000, but due to changes that were made to the law in 2002, the process has taken significantly longer than it would have if she had filed her paperwork 2 years later."

Belbin lived and trained in Canton, Michigan, for many years, before moving to Aston, Pennsylvania. After 2010, Belbin decided to move back to Michigan to attend Eastern Michigan University and be closer to friends and family, including then-boyfriend Charlie White. Belbin and White became engaged in June 2014 and were married on April 25, 2015. In 2017, their son was born.

Her father, Charles Belbin, is a public relations manager, while her mother, Michelle (née McKinlay) Belbin, is a former figure skater (who trained in St. John's, Newfoundland under Rolf Adomeit), coach, and costume designer. Michelle made some of Tanith's costumes.

== Career ==
Tanith Belbin began skating when she was almost three and started ice dancing at about eight or nine. She competed both as a pair skater and ice dancer in Canada before deciding to concentrate completely on ice dancing. She was introduced to ice dancing by Paul Wirtz and competed with partner Liam Dougherty. Her pairs partner was Ben Barruco, with whom she placed second at the novice level at the 1997 Canadian Championships. She did not compete with either partner internationally.

=== Partnership with Agosto ===
After a year without a partner in Canada, Belbin moved to Detroit in 1998, where she was partnered with Benjamin Agosto by their coach Igor Shpilband. In the 1999–2000 season, they won a pair of medals on the ISU Junior Grand Prix series and finished 4th at the JGP Final. They went on to win the U.S. junior national title and then took the bronze medal at the 2000 World Junior Championships. In 2000–2001, Belbin / Agosto competed again on the JGP series, taking gold in all three of their events including the Final. They appeared on the senior level at the 2001 U.S. Championships and won the silver medal, qualifying them for their first senior World Championships, where they finished 17th.

In 2001–2002, Belbin / Agosto made their senior Grand Prix debut and won another silver medal at the U.S. Championships, which would have qualified them for the 2002 Winter Olympics if Belbin had been an American citizen. Instead, Belbin and Agosto were sent to all the other ISU Championships for which they were eligible: Four Continents, Junior Worlds, and Worlds. They won the 2002 World Junior Championships, completing their set of medals from that event. Following that season, Agosto aged out of juniors.

Belbin / Agosto won the 2004 U.S. national title and would go on to repeat four times. At Nationals in 2005, the last year of the 6.0 system, Belbin / Agosto received straight perfect sixes for presentation in their free dance. Of the 30 6.0s given out in ice dance at U.S. Nationals, Belbin / Agosto have 14 of them. Their total 6.0 count at the U.S. Championships is second only to Michelle Kwan (38).

Belbin / Agosto won the silver medal at the 2005 World Championships.

Fans of Belbin / Agosto wrote letters and signed petitions asking for a special act of Congress to allow Belbin to become a citizen in time for her to compete at the 2006 Winter Olympics, where many believed they could win a medal. In addition, it was Belbin / Agosto who earned a third spot for the U.S. in the Olympic ice dancing event, by winning a medal at the 2005 World Championships, without which the U.S. would have had only two spots. However, the mother of fellow American ice dancer David Mitchell sent a letter to Senator Hillary Clinton, asking her to vote against it. She believed that it was unfair to bend the requirements for U.S. citizenship for Belbin, when other "aliens of extraordinary ability" were denied expedited citizenship. Ultimately, by a special act of Congress sponsored by Senator Carl Levin (D-MI) that passed on December 28, 2005, which President George W. Bush signed on December 31, 2005, Belbin became a naturalized citizen, allowing her to compete for the United States at the 2006 Winter Olympics.

In January 2006, Belbin / Agosto won their third consecutive national title and qualified for the Olympics. At the Turin Olympics, Belbin and Agosto won the silver medal in ice dancing, the first American ice dancers to win an Olympic medal in 30 years. They went on to win the bronze at Worlds.

Belbin / Agosto began the 2006–2007 season with a free dance called That's Entertainment but arrived at Nationals with a new program to the music of Amelie. They won gold at Nationals, the silver medal at Four Continents, and the bronze at Worlds.

In 2007–2008, they won gold medals at both Skate America and Cup of China which qualified them for the Grand Prix Final, where they took the silver medal. They won their 5th national title and then placed 4th at the 2008 Worlds after a fall by Belbin in the compulsory dance. Belbin / Agosto were regular cast members of the Champions on Ice tour from 2004 until COI went out of business following the 2007 season. They were guest stars on part of the 2008 Stars on Ice tour.

In April 2008, Belbin / Agosto left Igor Shpilband, who had coached them for their entire partnership, and began working with the married coaching team of Natalia Linichuk and Gennadi Karponosov at the IceWorks Skating Complex in Aston, Pennsylvania. In addition to teaching different technique, Linichuk advised Belbin to gain 10 pounds and develop some muscles in order to skate faster and more fluidly. This also gave Belbin more core strength to hold her positions better, thus making lifts easier for Agosto.

Belbin / Agosto began the 2008–2009 season at the 2008 Skate America and 2008 Cup of China, winning silver at both competitions. They withdrew from the 2008–2009 ISU Grand Prix Final after the original dance due to a back injury to Agosto. They withdrew from the 2009 U.S. Championships before the event began due to Agosto's injury. They were named to the team to the 2009 World Championships. At Worlds, they won the original dance and placed second in the compulsory and free dances to win the silver medal overall.

Belbin / Agosto won both their Grand Prix events in the 2009–10 season: the 2009 Cup of China and the 2009 Skate America. They withdrew from the Grand Prix Final for medical reasons. At the 2010 U.S. Championships, they were unable to reclaim their national title, finishing second behind Meryl Davis and Charlie White. Belbin and Agosto were nominated to represent the United States at the 2010 Winter Olympics. They finished 4th in the Olympic ice dancing event. They did not compete at the 2010 World Championships.

On June 10, 2010, Belbin / Agosto announced their retirement from eligible skating. They have continued to skate together in ice shows.

On December 15, 2015, U.S. Figure Skating announced Belbin and Agosto would be members of the U.S. Figure Skating Hall of Fame Class of 2016. The induction ceremony was held on January 22, 2016 at the 2016 U.S. Figure Skating Championships.

=== Post-competitive career ===
Belbin has worked as a commentator for ice dance competitions on Universal Sports Network, the ABC show Skating with the Stars, and for icenetwork.com. She has also worked as a commentator for four seasons of Curling Night in America, a NBCSN program that broadcasts a made-for-television curling competition.

In October 2011 Belbin competed as a pro on season 3 of Battle of the Blades paired with Boyd Devereaux; the pair placed 3rd in the competition.

Belbin also works as a choreographer.

=== Coaching career ===
In 2022, Belbin opened the Michigan Ice Dance Academy with Charlie White and Greg Zuerlein.

Their current and former teams include:

- Emily Bratti / Ian Somerville
- Molly Cesanek / Yehor Yehorov
- Caroline Green / Michael Parsons
- Annabelle Morozov / Jeffrey Chen
- Katarina Wolfkostin / Jeffrey Chen
- Katarina Wolfkostin / Dimitry Tsarevski

== Programs ==
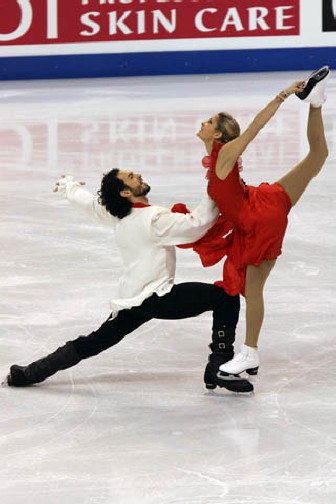
Belbin and Agosto perform a straight-line lift during their Tosca free dance at the 2009 World Championships.

(with Agosto)

Season	Original dance	Free dance	Exhibition
2009–2010	Moldavian folk dance: Moldovaneska	Ave Maria by Vladimir Vavilov performed by Sumi Jo; Amen from Stabat Mater by Gioachino Rossini	If It Kills Me performed by Jason Mraz
2008–2009	Stepping Out by John Kander, Fred Ebb	Tosca by Giacomo Puccini	Falling Slowly; Bleeding Love by Leona Lewis
2007–2008	Cotton Eyed Joe; Country Waltz; Appalachian Hoedown by Bluegrass	Selections by Frédéric Chopin arranged by Joseph Le Duca	Let's Get Loud by Jennifer Lopez; SexyBack; My Love by Justin Timberlake
2006–2007	Concierto Para Quinteto; Oblivion by Astor Piazzolla	Amélie by Yann Tiersen; Overture from That's Entertainment!	Let's Get Loud by Jennifer Lopez
2005–2006	Salsa Con Coco by Pochy y Su Cocoband; Let's Get Loud by Jennifer Lopez	Bulenas; Jaleo by Luis Winsberg; Duende by Esteban	Green Acres; American Woman; La Rosa; Let's Get Loud by Jennifer Lopez
2004–2005	Charleston: Cabaret; Slow Foxtrot: New York, New York; Quickstep: Cabaret	Russian gypsy dance: Shadritsa	Green Acres
2003–2004	Jitterbug: 5 months, 2 weeks, 2 days by Louis Prima; Blues: Give me Some Money Too by Leni Hester; Swing: Hey Pachuco by Royal Crown Revue	West Side Story by Leonard Bernstein	Elvis Presley medley; Green Acres
2002–2003	Waltz: Libiamo ne' lieti calici (from La traviata) by Giuseppe Verdi; Polka: Jolly Robbers by Franz von Suppé	Heartbreak Hotel; Hound Dog; Jailhouse Rock; Teddy Bear by Elvis Presley	Elvis Presley medley (modified FD)
2001–2002	Flamenco (from The Mask of Zorro) by James Horner; A Los Amigos	Sarajevo by Goran Bregović	Oscar Tango
2000–2001	Foxtrot: More by Nat King Cole; Quickstep: Girls, Girls, Girls	Alexandros by Staminis Spanudikis	Une Vie d'Amour
1999–2000		The Four Seasons by Antonio Vivaldi	Une Vie d'Amour

== Competitive highlights ==
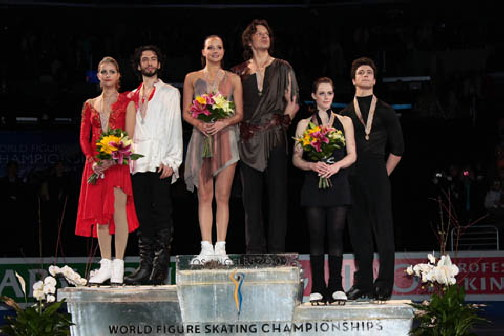
Belbin and Agosto (left) on the podium at the 2009 World Championships

(ice dancing with Agosto)

Results
International
Event	1999–00	2000–01	2001–02	2002–03	2003–04	2004–05	2005–06	2006–07	2007–08	2008–09	2009–10
Olympics							2nd				4th
Worlds		17th	13th	7th	5th	2nd	3rd	3rd	4th	2nd	
Four Continents			2nd	2nd	1st	1st	1st	2nd			
Grand Prix Final					3rd	2nd		WD	2nd	WD	WD
GP Cup of China						1st		2nd	1st	2nd	1st
GP Cup of Russia					2nd			1st			
GP Lalique			6th	3rd	4th						
GP Skate America			5th	3rd	1st	1st	1st		1st	2nd	1st
Goodwill Games			5th								
Nebelhorn							1st				
International: Junior
Junior Worlds	3rd	2nd	1st								
JGP Final	4th	1st									
JGP Canada	1st										
JGP Germany		1st									
JGP Japan	2nd										
JGP Mexico		1st									
National
U.S. Champ.	1st J.	2nd	2nd	2nd	1st	1st	1st	1st	1st	WD	2nd
Team events
World Team										1T / 1P	
GP = Grand Prix; JGP = Junior Grand Prix; J. = Junior level; WD = Withdrew; T = Team result; P = Personal result; Medals awarded for team result only.
