= 2021 Skate America =

International figure skating competition

- Type: Grand Prix
- Date: October 22 – 24
- Season: 2021–22
- Location: Las Vegas, Nevada, United States
- Host: U.S. Figure Skating
- Venue: Orleans Arena

Champions
- Men's singles: (United States) Vincent Zhou
- Women's singles: (Russia) Alexandra Trusova
- Pairs: (Russia) Evgenia Tarasova and Vladimir Morozov
- Ice dance: (United States) Madison Hubbell and Zachary Donohue
- Previous: 2020 Skate America
- Next: 2022 Skate America
- Next Grand Prix: 2021 Skate Canada International

The 2021 Skate America was a figure skating competition sanctioned by the International Skating Union (ISU), organized and hosted by U.S. Figure Skating, and the first event of the 2021–22 ISU Grand Prix of Figure Skating series. It was held at the Orleans Arena in Las Vegas, Nevada, in the United States, from October 22 to 24, 2021. Medals were awarded in men's singles, women's singles, pair skating, and ice dance. Skaters earned points based on their results, and the top skaters or teams in each discipline at the end of the season were then invited to then compete at the 2021–22 Grand Prix Final in Osaka, Japan. Vincent Zhou of the United States won the men's event, Alexandra Trusova of Russia won the women's event, Evgenia Tarasova and Vladimir Morozov of Russia won the pairs event, and Madison Hubbell and Zachary Donohue of the United States won the ice dance event.

== Background ==
The ISU Grand Prix of Figure Skating is a series of seven events sanctioned by the International Skating Union (ISU) and held during the autumn: six qualifying events and the Grand Prix Final. This allows skaters to perfect their programs earlier in the season, as well as compete against the skaters with whom they will later compete at the World Championships. This series also provides the viewing public with additional televised skating, which was in high demand. Skaters earn points based on their results in their respective competitions and the top skaters or teams in each discipline are invited to compete at the Grand Prix Final. The first iteration of Skate America – then called the Norton Skate – was held in 1979 in Lake Placid, New York, and was the test event for the 1980 Winter Olympics. When the ISU launched the Grand Prix series in 1995, Skate America was one of the five qualifying events. It has been a Grand Prix event every year since.

== Changes to preliminary assignments ==
The International Skating Union announced the preliminary list of entrants on June 29, 2021.

| Discipline | Withdrew | | Added | | Notes | Ref. |
| Discipline | Date | Skater(s) | Date | Skater(s) | Notes | Ref. |
|---|---|---|---|---|---|---|
| Men | —N/a | | September 2 | (United States); Yaroslav Paniot | Host picks | |
| Women | —N/a | | September 2 | (United States); Audrey Shin | Host picks | |
| Pairs | —N/a | | September 2 | (United States); Jessica Calalang; Brian Johnson | Host picks | |
| Ice dance | —N/a | | September 2 | (United States); Molly Cesanek; Yehor Yehorov | Host picks | |
| Men | October 11 | (Russia); Daniil Samsonov | —N/a | | Medical reasons | |
| Men | October 11 | (United States); Yaroslav Paniot | October 11 | (United States); Jimmy Ma | —N/a | |
| Ice dance | October 13 | (Russia); Tiffany Zahorski; Jonathan Guerreiro | —N/a | | Hospitalization (Zahorski) | |
| Women | October 18 | (United States); Bradie Tennell | October 18 | (United States); Starr Andrews | Injury | |

== Required performance elements ==
=== Single skating ===
Men competing in single skating first performed their short programs on Friday, October 22, while women performed theirs on Saturday, October 23. Lasting no more than 2 minutes 40 seconds, the short program had to include the following elements:

For men: one double or triple Axel; one triple or quadruple jump; one jump combination consisting of a double jump and a triple jump, two triple jumps, or a quadruple jump and a double jump or triple jump; one flying spin; one camel spin or sit spin with a change of foot; one spin combination with a change of foot; and a step sequence using the full ice surface.

For women: one double or triple Axel; one triple jump; one jump combination consisting of a double jump and a triple jump, or two triple jumps; one flying spin; one layback spin, sideways leaning spin, camel spin, or sit spin without a change of foot; one spin combination with a change of foot; and one step sequence using the full ice surface.

Men then performed their free skates on Saturday, October 23, while women performed theirs on Sunday, October 24. The free skate for both men and women could last no more than 4 minutes, and had to include the following: seven jump elements, of which one had to be an Axel-type jump; three spins, of which one had to be a spin combination, one had to be a flying spin, and one had to be a spin with only one position; a step sequence; and a choreographic sequence.

=== Pair skating ===
Couples competing in pair skating performed their short programs on Friday, October 22. Lasting no more than 2 minutes 40 seconds, it had to include the following elements: one pair lift, one twist lift, one double or triple throw jump, one double or triple solo jump, one solo spin combination with a change of foot, one death spiral, and a step sequence using the full ice surface.

Couples performed their free skates on Saturday, October 23. The free skate could last no more than 4 minutes, and had to include the following: three pair lifts, of which one had to be a twist lift; two different throw jumps; one solo jump; one jump combination or sequence; one pair spin combination; one death spiral; and a choreographic sequence.

=== Ice dance ===
Couples competing in ice dance performed their rhythm dances on Saturday, October 23. Lasting no more than 2 minutes 50 seconds, the theme of the rhythm dance this season was "street dance rhythms". Examples of applicable dance styles included, but were not limited, to: hip-hop, disco, swing, krump, popping, funk, jazz, reggae (reggaeton), and blues. The required pattern dance element was the Midnight Blues. The rhythm dance had to include the following elements: the pattern dance, the pattern dance step sequence, one dance lift, one set of sequential twizzles, and one step sequence.

Couples performed their free dances on Sunday, October 24. The free dance performance could last no longer than 4 minutes, and had to include the following: three dance lifts, one dance spin, one set of synchronized twizzles, one step sequence in hold, one step sequence while on one skate and not touching, and three choreographic elements, of which one had to be a choreographic character step sequence.

== Judging ==
For the 2021–2022 season, all of the technical elements in any figure skating performance – such as jumps, spins, and lifts – were assigned a predetermined base point value and were then scored by a panel of nine judges on a scale from -5 to 5 based on their quality of execution. The judging panel's Grade of Execution (GOE) was determined by calculating the trimmed mean (that is, an average after deleting the highest and lowest scores), and this GOE was added to the base value to come up with the final score for each element. The panel's scores for all elements were added together to generate a total element score. At the same time, judges evaluated each performance based on five program components – skating skills, transitions, performance, composition, and interpretation of the music – and assigned a score from .25 to 10 in .25 point increments. The judging panel's final score for each program component was also determined by calculating the trimmed mean. Those scores were then multiplied by the factor shown on the following chart; the results were added together to generate a total program component score.

Program component factoring
| Discipline | Short program or Rhythm dance | Free skate or Free dance |
|---|---|---|
| Men | 1.00 | 2.00 |
| Women | 0.80 | 1.60 |
| Pairs | 0.80 | 1.60 |
| Ice dance | 0.80 | 1.20 |

Deductions were applied for certain violations like time infractions, stops and restarts, or falls. The total element score and total program component score were added together, minus any deductions, to generate a final performance score for each skater or team.

== Medal summary ==
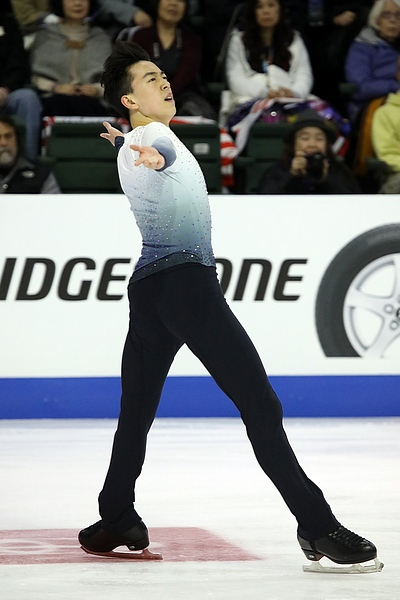
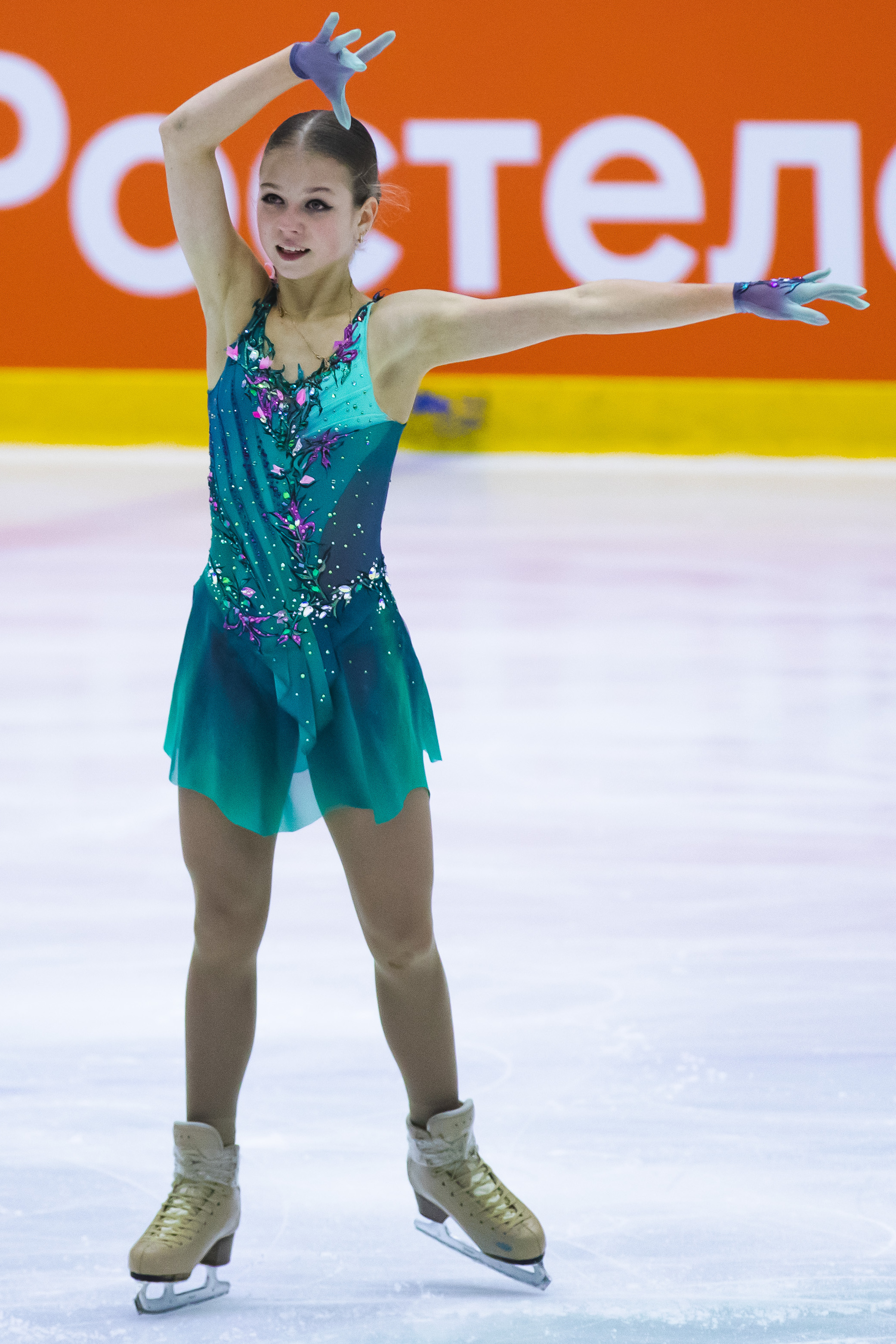
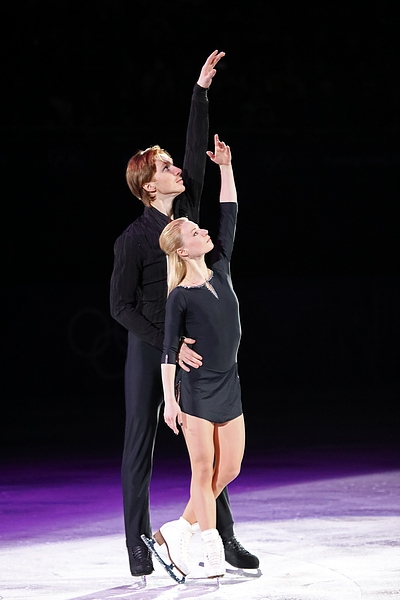
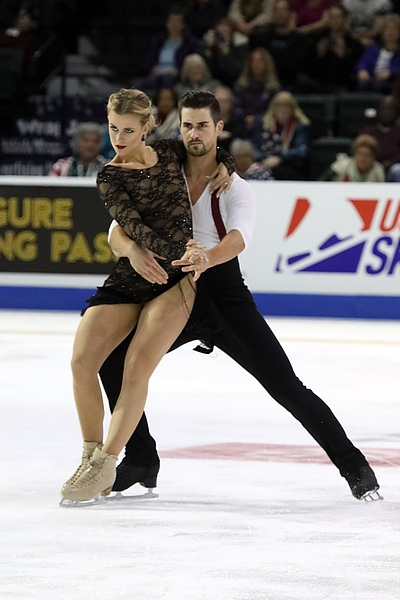
From left to right: The 2021 Skate America champions: Vincent Zhou of the United States (men's singles); Alexandra Trusova of Russia (women's singles); Evgenia Tarasova and Vladimir Morozov of Russia (pair skating); and Madison Hubbell and Zachary Donohue of the United States (ice dance)

Medalists
| Discipline | Gold | Silver | Bronze |
|---|---|---|---|
| Men | (United States) Vincent Zhou | (Japan) Shoma Uno | (United States) Nathan Chen |
| Women | (Russia) Alexandra Trusova | (Russia) Daria Usacheva | (South Korea) You Young |
| Pairs | (Russia); Evgenia Tarasova; Vladimir Morozov | (Japan); Riku Miura; Ryuichi Kihara | (Russia); Aleksandra Boikova; Dmitrii Kozlovskii |
| Ice dance | (United States); Madison Hubbell; Zachary Donohue | (United States); Madison Chock; Evan Bates | (Canada); Laurence Fournier Beaudry; Nikolaj Sørensen |

== Results ==
=== Men's singles ===
Men's results
| Rank | Skater | Nation | Total points | SP | | FS | |
|---|---|---|---|---|---|---|---|
| 1st place, gold medalist(s) | Vincent Zhou | United States | 295.56 | 1 | 97.43 | 1 | 198.13 |
| 2nd place, silver medalist(s) | Shoma Uno | Japan | 270.68 | 2 | 89.07 | 3 | 181.61 |
| 3rd place, bronze medalist(s) | Nathan Chen | United States | 269.37 | 4 | 82.89 | 2 | 186.48 |
| 4 | Shun Sato | Japan | 247.05 | 5 | 80.52 | 4 | 166.53 |
| 5 | Jimmy Ma | United States | 228.12 | 3 | 84.52 | 10 | 143.60 |
| 6 | Michal Březina | Czech Republic | 227.47 | 6 | 75.43 | 5 | 152.04 |
| 7 | Daniel Grassl | Italy | 221.43 | 8 | 70.88 | 6 | 150.55 |
| 8 | Nam Nguyen | Canada | 219.60 | 7 | 74.32 | 9 | 145.28 |
| 9 | Adam Siao Him Fa | France | 217.52 | 10 | 67.60 | 7 | 149.92 |
| 10 | Artur Danielian | Russia | 214.93 | 9 | 68.74 | 8 | 146.19 |
| WD | Kévin Aymoz | France | Withdrew | 11 | 58.14 | Withdrew from competition | |

=== Women's singles ===
Women's results
| Rank | Skater | Nation | Total points | SP | | FS | |
|---|---|---|---|---|---|---|---|
| 1st place, gold medalist(s) | Alexandra Trusova | Russia | 232.37 | 1 | 77.69 | 1 | 154.68 |
| 2nd place, silver medalist(s) | Daria Usacheva | Russia | 217.31 | 2 | 76.71 | 4 | 140.60 |
| 3rd place, bronze medalist(s) | You Young | South Korea | 216.97 | 5 | 70.73 | 2 | 146.24 |
| 4 | Kaori Sakamoto | Japan | 215.93 | 4 | 71.16 | 3 | 144.77 |
| 5 | Kseniia Sinitsyna | Russia | 205.76 | 3 | 71.51 | 5 | 134.25 |
| 6 | Amber Glenn | United States | 201.02 | 7 | 67.57 | 7 | 133.45 |
| 7 | Satoko Miyahara | Japan | 200.51 | 8 | 66.36 | 6 | 134.15 |
| 8 | Kim Ye-lim | South Korea | 199.34 | 6 | 70.56 | 8 | 128.78 |
| 9 | Ekaterina Kurakova | Poland | 188.60 | 11 | 61.36 | 9 | 127.24 |
| 10 | Starr Andrews | United States | 177.63 | 10 | 61.94 | 11 | 115.69 |
| 11 | Yuhana Yokoi | Japan | 174.07 | 12 | 54.77 | 10 | 119.30 |
| 12 | Audrey Shin | United States | 160.78 | 9 | 62.82 | 12 | 97.96 |

=== Pairs ===
Pairs results
| Rank | Team | Nation | Total points | SP | | FS | |
|---|---|---|---|---|---|---|---|
| 1st place, gold medalist(s) | Evgenia Tarasova; Vladimir Morozov | Russia | 222.50 | 1 | 80.36 | 1 | 142.14 |
| 2nd place, silver medalist(s) | Riku Miura; Ryuichi Kihara | Japan | 208.20 | 3 | 72.63 | 3 | 135.57 |
| 3rd place, bronze medalist(s) | Aleksandra Boikova; Dmitrii Kozlovskii | Russia | 205.53 | 2 | 75.43 | 4 | 130.10 |
| 4 | Alexa Knierim; Brandon Frazier | United States | 202.97 | 5 | 66.37 | 2 | 136.60 |
| 5 | Jessica Calalang; Brian Johnson | United States | 197.42 | 4 | 68.87 | 5 | 128.55 |
| 6 | Alina Pepeleva; Roman Pleshkov | Russia | 183.12 | 6 | 64.15 | 6 | 118.97 |
| 7 | Chelsea Liu; Daniel O'Shea | United States | 175.40 | 7 | 60.16 | 7 | 115.24 |
| 8 | Evelyn Walsh; Trennt Michaud | Canada | 147.61 | 8 | 54.03 | 8 | 93.58 |

=== Ice dance ===
Ice dance results
| Rank | Team | Nation | Total points | RD | | FD | |
|---|---|---|---|---|---|---|---|
| 1st place, gold medalist(s) | Madison Hubbell; Zachary Donohue | United States | 209.54 | 1 | 83.58 | 1 | 125.96 |
| 2nd place, silver medalist(s) | Madison Chock; Evan Bates | United States | 208.23 | 2 | 82.55 | 2 | 125.68 |
| 3rd place, bronze medalist(s) | Laurence Fournier Beaudry; Nikolaj Sørensen | Canada | 190.13 | 3 | 75.33 | 4 | 114.80 |
| 4 | Olivia Smart; Adrián Díaz | Spain | 189.69 | 4 | 74.06 | 3 | 115.63 |
| 5 | Annabelle Morozov; Andrei Bagin | Russia | 175.32 | 5 | 68.79 | 5 | 106.53 |
| 6 | Misato Komatsubara; Tim Koleto | Japan | 164.32 | 7 | 63.56 | 6 | 100.76 |
| 7 | Carolane Soucisse; Shane Firus | Canada | 162.02 | 8 | 63.08 | 7 | 98.94 |
| 8 | Natalia Kaliszek; Maksym Spodyriev | Poland | 160.32 | 6 | 65.30 | 9 | 95.02 |
| 9 | Molly Cesanek; Yehor Yehorov | United States | 156.97 | 9 | 61.07 | 8 | 95.90 |

== Works cited ==
- "Special Regulations & Technical Rules – Single & Pair Skating and Ice Dance 2021". International Skating Union. Archived from the original on April 4, 2022.
