= Charlie White (figure skater) =

American ice dancer (born 1987)

Charles White
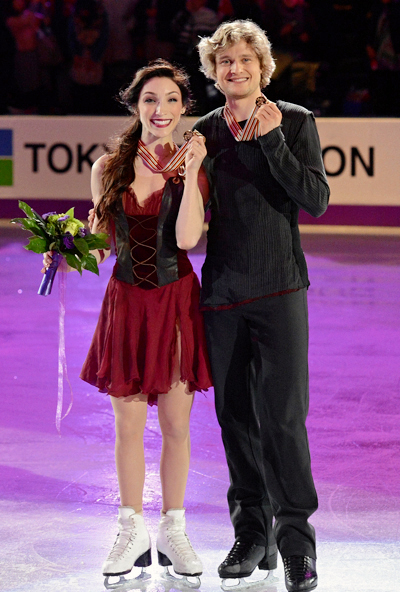
- White at the 2013 World Championships

Personal information
- Full name: Charles Allen White Jr.
- Born: October 24, 1987 (age 38) Dearborn, Michigan, U.S.
- Home town: Ann Arbor, Michigan, U.S.
- Height: 5 ft 9 in (1.75 m)

Figure skating career
- Country: United States
- Discipline: Ice dance
- Began skating: 1992
- Retired: February 23, 2017
- Highest WS: 1st (2009–10, 2010–11, 2011–12, 2012–13 & 2013–14)
Event	Gold medal – first place	Silver medal – second place	Bronze medal – third place
Olympic Games	1	1	1
World Championships	2	2	0
Four Continents Championships	3	2	0
Grand Prix Final	5	0	1
U.S. Championships	6	1	1
World Team Trophy	0	1	0
World Junior Championships	0	0	1
Junior Grand Prix Final	0	1	0
Medal list
Olympic Games
Gold medal – first place	2014 Sochi	Ice dance
Silver medal – second place	2010 Vancouver	Ice dance
Bronze medal – third place	2014 Sochi	Team
World Championships
Gold medal – first place	2011 Moscow	Ice dance
Gold medal – first place	2013 London	Ice dance
Silver medal – second place	2010 Turin	Ice dance
Silver medal – second place	2012 Nice	Ice dance
Four Continents Championships
Gold medal – first place	2009 Vancouver	Ice dance
Gold medal – first place	2011 Taipei	Ice dance
Gold medal – first place	2013 Osaka	Ice dance
Silver medal – second place	2008 Goyang	Ice dance
Silver medal – second place	2012 Colorado Springs	Ice dance
Grand Prix Final
Gold medal – first place	2009–10 Tokyo	Ice dance
Gold medal – first place	2010–11 Beijing	Ice dance
Gold medal – first place	2011–12 Quebec City	Ice dance
Gold medal – first place	2012–13 Sochi	Ice dance
Gold medal – first place	2013–14 Fukuoka	Ice dance
Bronze medal – third place	2008–09 Goyang	Ice dance
U.S. Championships
Gold medal – first place	2009 Cleveland	Ice dance
Gold medal – first place	2010 Spokane	Ice dance
Gold medal – first place	2011 Greensboro	Ice dance
Gold medal – first place	2012 San Jose	Ice dance
Gold medal – first place	2013 Omaha	Ice dance
Gold medal – first place	2014 Boston	Ice dance
Silver medal – second place	2008 Saint Paul	Ice dance
Bronze medal – third place	2007 Spokane	Ice dance
World Team Trophy
Silver medal – second place	2012 Tokyo	Team
World Junior Championships
Bronze medal – third place	2006 Ljubljana	Ice dance
Junior Grand Prix Final
Silver medal – second place	2005–06 Ostrava	Ice dance

Charles Allen White Jr. (born October 24, 1987) is an American former competitive ice dancer. With partner Meryl Davis, he is the 2014 Olympic Champion, the 2010 Olympic silver medalist, a two-time (2011, 2013) World champion, five-time Grand Prix Final champion (2009–2013), three-time Four Continents champion (2009, 2011, 2013) and six-time U.S. national champion (2009–2014). They also won a bronze medal in the team event at the 2014 Winter Olympics.

Davis and White teamed up in 1997 and they are currently the longest-lasting dance team in the United States. They are the first American ice dancers to win the World title, as well as the first Americans to win the Olympic title. At the 2006 NHK Trophy, they became the first ice dancing team to receive level fours on all their elements.

== Personal life ==
White was born in the Detroit suburb of Dearborn, Michigan, the son of Jacqui and Charlie White Sr. He attended Roeper School in Birmingham, Michigan from nursery school through high school where he played violin in the school string quartet and was involved with the student government. White graduated in 2005. He later enrolled at the University of Michigan, studying political science. He formerly competed as an ice hockey player and helped his team to a state championship. He has asthma.

White lives in Ann Arbor, Michigan.

In 2010, his then-girlfriend, ice dancer Tanith Belbin, retired from competition and moved to Michigan to be with him. Belbin and White became engaged in June 2014, and were married on April 25, 2015. In 2017, their son was born.

== Career ==
=== Early career ===
White began skating at age five. He originally competed as both a single skater and an ice dancer. As a single skater, he won the bronze medal at the 2004 U.S. Championships on the Novice level, and competed internationally on the junior level. He quit skating singles following the 2005–06 season in order to focus on ice dancing.

He began ice dancing when he was seven at his coach's advice, who hoped it would smooth out White's skating. He was partnered with Meryl Davis in 1997, by Seth Chafetz. In 2009, Davis said: "Charlie and I grew up 10 minutes apart from each other. Our parents are best friends. We've grown together and know each other so well."

In their first season together, Davis/White won the silver medal at the Junior Olympics in the Juvenile division. In 1999-00, they won gold at the Junior Olympics on the intermediate level. In the 2000–01 season, they qualified for the 2001 U.S. Championships, placing 6th as Novices. In 2001-02, they won the silver medal as novices and then moved up to the junior level. In the 2002-03 season, they did not win a medal at either of their two Junior Grand Prix assignments and placed 7th at the 2003 U.S. Championships in their junior debut.

=== Junior career ===
In the 2003–04 season, Davis/White won their sectional championship and then won the junior silver medal at Nationals. This earned them a trip to the 2004 Junior Worlds, where they placed 13th.

In the 2004–2005 season, Davis/White won two bronze on the ISU Junior Grand Prix series. However, White broke his ankle before Sectionals and so Davis/White were unable to qualify for the 2005 U.S. Championships. Their season ended there.

In the 2005–06 season, Davis/White medaled at both their Junior Grand Prix events and placed second at the Junior Grand Prix Final. They won the junior national title at the 2006 U.S. Championships and then won the bronze medal at the 2006 Junior Worlds. Following that season, Davis aged out of Juniors. They lost some training time after White broke his ankle at a hockey tournament in 2006.

=== Senior career ===
==== 2006–2007 season ====
In the 2006–07 season, Davis/White made their debut both nationally and internationally as seniors. They placed 4th at both their 2006–07 ISU Grand Prix assignments. At the 2006 NHK Trophy, they became the first team to earn all level fours on their elements. At the 2007 U.S. Championships, they won the bronze medal at the senior level, qualifying them for the 2007 World Championships. They are the first team since Tanith Belbin/Benjamin Agosto to go directly from winning the Junior national title to making the World team.

Davis/White also qualified for the Four Continents Championships, which took place before Worlds, and placed fourth. At the World Championships, Davis/White placed 7th, the highest debut placement for American ice dancers at Worlds since 1980.

==== 2007–2008 season ====
Davis/White placed 4th at the 2007 Skate America and then went on to win their first Grand Prix medal at the 2007 Trophée Eric Bompard.

They completely revamped their Eleanor Rigby Eleanor's Dream free dance before the 2008 U.S. Championships due to its poor reception. They won the silver medal at the competition, one spot up from the previous season. They also won silver at 2008 Four Continents and were sixth at the 2008 World Championships.

==== 2008–2009 season ====
In the 2008–2009 season, Davis/White won their first Grand Prix assignment, the 2008 Skate Canada. In their second assignment, the 2008 Cup of Russia, they placed third in the compulsory dance but were eighth in the original dance after White fell twice and stumbled on twizzles. They recovered in the free dance, placing second in the segment and moving up to win the bronze medal, which together with the gold from Skate Canada was enough to qualify them for their first Grand Prix Final. At the 2008–2009 Grand Prix Final, they won the bronze medal.

Davis/White won gold at the 2009 National Championships, after reigning champions Belbin/Agosto withdrew due to injury. They won by a 20-point margin over silver medalists Emily Samuelson / Evan Bates. In February 2009, they won the ice dance title at the Four Continents Championships, placing second in both the compulsory and original dance behind training mates Tessa Virtue / Scott Moir but winning the free dance. At the 2009 World Championships they placed 4th. Though they placed third in both the original and free dance portions, they lost too much ground in the compulsory to overcome training mates Virtue and Moir for the bronze. Only .04 points separated 3rd from 4th.

==== 2009–2010 season ====
Davis/White competed at the 2009 Nebelhorn Trophy, finishing first in all the segments of the competition. Overall they won the gold medal with a score of 200.46 points, 30.87 ahead of silver medalists Alexandra Zaretsky / Roman Zaretsky.

Davis/White won the 2009 Rostelecom Cup and the 2009 NHK Trophy, which qualified them for the 2009–2010 Grand Prix Final. At the Grand Prix Final, they won the original dance and placed second in the free dance to win the title overall, becoming the first American ice dancers to do so. At the 2010 National Championships, Davis and White won their second national title. They beat former training partners Belbin/Agosto, the first time they had ever done so, and led through all portions of the competition.

At the 2010 Winter Olympics in Vancouver, British Columbia, Canada, Davis/White placed second to Canada's Virtue/Moir, winning silver. They skated a personal best in the free skate portion of ice dancing, garnering a score of 107.19 and receiving a personal best total score of 215.74. They also won the silver medal at the 2010 World Championships.

==== 2010–2011 season ====
Davis/White were undefeated in their 2010–2011 season.

For the 2010–11 ISU Grand Prix season, they were assigned to the 2010 NHK Trophy and to the 2010 Skate America. They won NHK with 66.97 points in the short dance and 98.24 in the free dance, for a total of 165.21 points. Following NHK, they decided to make some adjustments to their free dance. At Skate America they earned 63.62 in the short dance and 93.06 points in the free dance after both fell, with their nearest rivals also having a fall. They earned an overall total of 156.68 and the gold medal. Their results qualified them for the 2010–2011 Grand Prix Final where they successfully defended their title, scoring 68.64 in the short and 102.94 in the free for a total of 171.58 points. They won their 3rd consecutive national title at the U.S. Championships held at Greensboro, North Carolina. They earned 76.04 points for their short dance and 109.44 points for their free dance scoring a total of 185.48 points.

At the 2011 Four Continents Championships, Davis/White placed second to Virtue/Moir in the short dance. The Canadians later withdrew from the free dance. Davis/White went on to win the free dance and the title with a total of 172.03 points. At the 2011 World Championships, they placed second in the short dance by 0.53 points, with a score of 73.76 points. In the free dance, they placed first with a score of 111.51 points, the highest free dance score that season. Overall, they won the gold medal with a score of 185.27, beating reigning Olympic and World champions Virtue/Moir by 3.48 points. This was the United States' first ice dancing World title.

==== 2011–2012 season ====
For the 2011–2012 season, Davis/White were assigned to two Grand Prix events—2011 Skate America and 2011 Cup of Russia—having declined a newly introduced option to compete in a third. They announced their music selections in August, including La Strada for their free dance, but in October announced a change to Die Fledermaus. Davis and White won gold at Skate America, with 70.33 points in the short dance and 107.74 points in the free dance. They were 21.78 points ahead of 2nd place team Nathalie Péchalat / Fabian Bourzat. At 2011 Rostelecom Cup, the couple improved with a total score of 179.06, despite a small stumble in the short dance. They placed 17.88 points ahead of 2nd place team Kaitlyn Weaver / Andrew Poje. Their placements qualified them for the 2011–2012 Grand Prix Final, where they placed first. The two would later become silver medalists at the 2012 Four Continents Championships and 2012 World Championships. However, at the 2012 World Team Trophy, they edged Virtue/Moir by 5.6 points, and Team USA won the silver medal. Following Igor Shpilband's dismissal from the Arctic Edge Arena in June 2012, Davis/White decided to remain at the rink with Marina Zoueva and ended their collaboration with Shpilband.

==== 2012–2013 season ====
For the 2012–2013 season, Davis/White were assigned to compete at 2012 Skate America and the 2012 NHK Trophy, winning gold in both events. In December, they set a record by becoming the first team to win four Grand Prix Final titles, when they came in first in both the short and free dances. In January 2013, they won their fifth consecutive National title, tying for the U.S. ice dance record. They set U.S. scoring records in both the short and free dances. They continued their undefeated season winning the gold medal at the 2013 Four Continents, despite a small bobble that left them in second in the short dance portion. They won the free dance ahead of Virtue/Moir. Then, at the World Championships in March, they again defeated Virtue/Moir to win their second world championship title, breaking their previous world records in both the short dance and combined total.

==== 2013–2014 season ====
Davis and White worked with Derek Hough and Alex Wong on their programs for 2013 and 2014. On February 5, 2014, the pair appeared among five other Olympians in a one-hour special on NBC television, How to Raise an Olympian. During the team event at the 2014 Winter Olympics in Sochi, Davis and White earned 20 points in two first-place finishes for the U.S. team, which was awarded bronze medal overall. Davis and White posted record scores in both the short program and free dance and were awarded the first Olympic gold medal for Americans in ice dancing. They performed with Stars on Ice in 2014.

=== Post-competitive career ===
Davis and White continue to perform together in ice shows and White has also worked on television as an ice dancing commentator. On February 23, 2017, they confirmed that they would not return to competition.

=== Coaching career ===
In 2022, White opened the Michigan Ice Dance Academy with Tanith Belbin White and Greg Zuerlein in Canton, Michigan.

Their current and former teams include:

- Emily Bratti / Ian Somerville
- Molly Cesanek / Yehor Yehorov
- Caroline Green / Michael Parsons
- Annabelle Morozov / Jeffrey Chen
- Katarina Wolfkostin / Jeffrey Chen
- Katarina Wolfkostin / Dimitry Tsarevski

== Programs ==
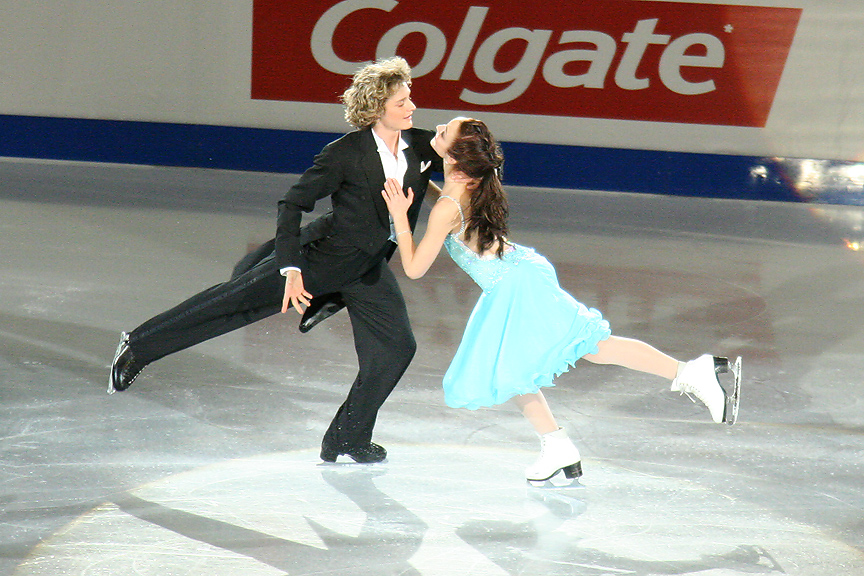
Davis & White perform their Beyond the Sea exhibition at the 2006 Skate Canada International.

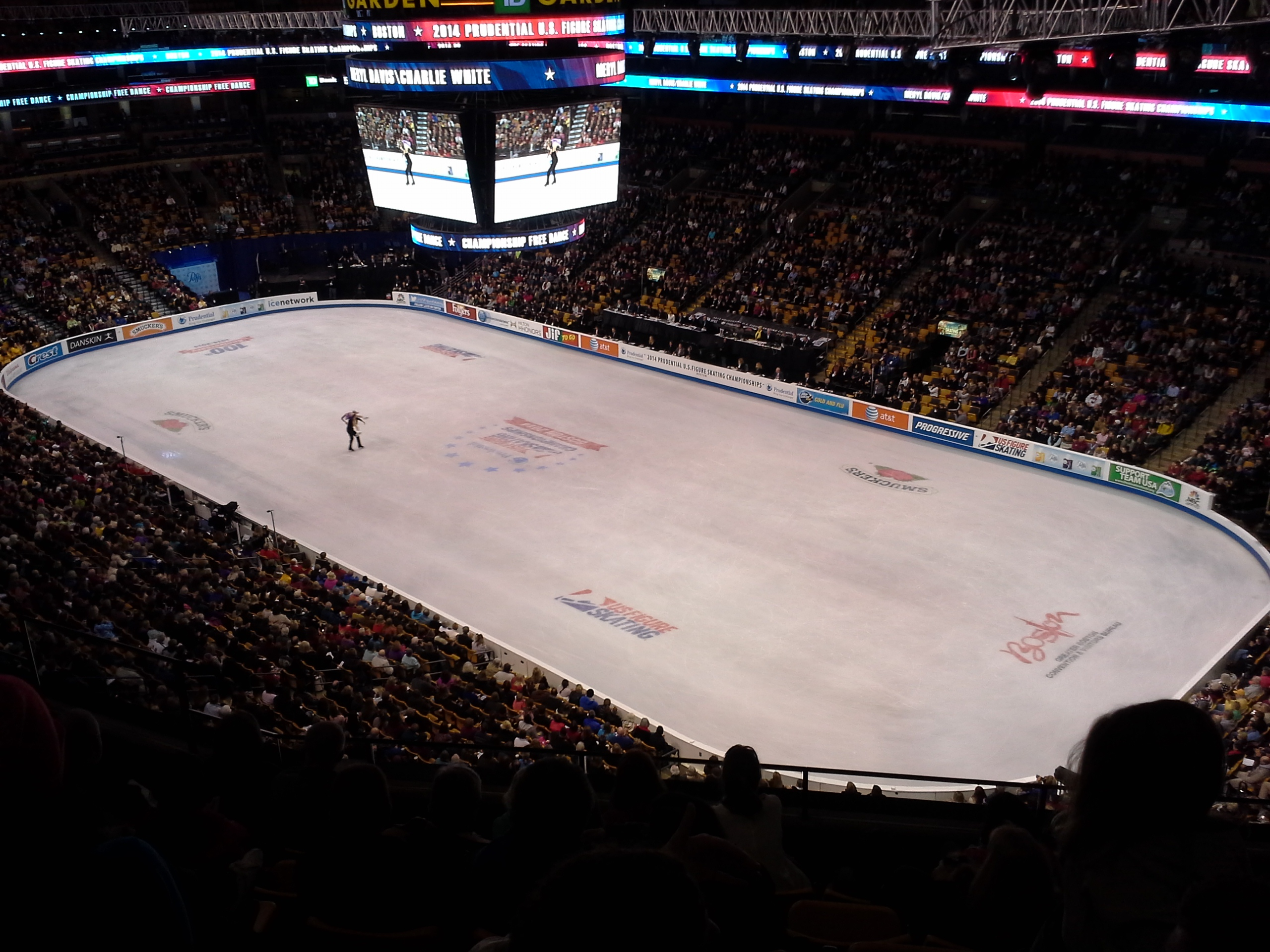
Meryl Davis and Charlie White perform their free dance at the 2014 U.S. Figure Skating Championships.

=== Post–2014 ===
Season	Exhibition
2018–2019	"Lilac Wine" by James Shelton, performed by The Cinematic Orchestra; Queen Medley
2017–2018	"Elastic Heart" by Sia; "Hold my Hand" by Jess Glynne; "Breathing Underwater" by Emeli Sandé; "Lay Low" by Pegasus; "Orpheus and Eurydice" - Immortal Love; "Eros and Psyche" - Di quella pira from Il trovatore by Giuseppe Verdi, performed by Andrea Bocelli
2016–2017	"Adagio for Strings" by Samuel Barber; "Love Me Still" performed by Chaka Khan; "Scheherazade" by Nikolai Rimsky-Korsakov; "Sax" by Fleur East. choreo. by Jeffrey Buttle; "Un Sospiro" by Franz Liszt, choreo. by Marina Zoueva
2015–2016	"Dog Days Are Over" by Florence + the Machine, choreo. by Sharna Burgess; "Dream" by Imagine Dragons; "Blame It on the Boogie" by The Jackson 5; "Flashlight" by Jessie J
2014–2015	"Say Something" by A Great Big World, Christina Aguilera, choreo. by Sharna Burgess; Sleeping Beauty: "Sleeping Beauty Waltz" by Pyotr Ilyich Tchaikovsky; "Once Upon a Dream" by Jack Lawrence, Sammy Fain

=== Pre–2014 ===
Season	Short dance	Free dance	Exhibition
2013–2014	"I Could Have Danced All Night"; "With a Little Bit of Luck"; "Get Me to the Church on Time" from My Fair Lady by Frederick Loewe	"Scheherazade" by Nikolai Rimsky-Korsakov	"Scheherazade" by Nikolai Rimsky-Korsakov; "Fade Into You" by Sam Palladio, Clare Bowen of Nashville; "Piano Concerto no. 2, II: adagio sostenuto" by Sergei Rachmaninoff
2012–2013	Giselle by Adolphe Adam	Vivre; La cour des miracles; Danse mon Esmeralda from Notre-Dame de Paris by Riccardo Cocciante	"Fade Into You" by Sam Palladio, Clare Bowen of Nashville; "Someone like You" by Adele; "The Way I Am" by Ingrid Michaelson; "Rhythm of Love" by Plain White T's
2011–2012	"Batucadas" by Mitoka Samba; "Life is a Carnival" by various artists; "On the Floor" by Jennifer Lopez	"Die Fledermaus" by Johann Strauss II	"Someone like You" by Adele
2010–2011	Waltz: "Brindisi" from La traviata by Giuseppe Verdi; Waltz: "Musetta's Waltz" from La bohème by Giacomo Puccini	Il Postino (soundtrack) by Luis Bacalov; Payadora (Forever Tango); Recuerdo (Forever Tango) by Lisandro Adrover	"The Way I Am" by Ingrid Michaelson; "Rhythm of Love" by Plain White T's
	Original dance		
2009–2010	"Kajra Re" from Bunty Aur Babli by Shankar Mahadevan, Ehsaan Noorani and Loy Mendonsa; "Silsila Ye Chahat Ka"; "Dola Re Dola" from Devdas by Ismail Darbar and Nusrat Badr (lyricist)	"Overture"; "The Music of the Night"; "The Point of No Return" from The Phantom of the Opera by Andrew Lloyd Webber	"Billie Jean" by Michael Jackson performed by David Cook
2008–2009	"Happy Feet" by Jack Yellen and Milton Ager; 20's Piano original composition by Joe Laduke	"Bacchanale"; "S'Apre Per Te Il Mio Cuore" from Samson and Delilah by Camille Saint-Saëns performed by Filippa Giordano	"Don't Stop Me Now" by Queen
2007–2008	"Kalinka" by Ivan Larionov	"Eleanor's Dream"; "Eleanor Rigby" by The Beatles	Beyond the Sea by Bobby Darin performed by Kevin Spacey
2006–2007	"A Los Amigos" by Ástor Piazzolla	"Prince Igor" from Polovtsian Dances by Alexander Borodin	Beyond the Sea by Bobby Darin performed by Kevin Spacey
2005–2006	"Ran Kan Kan"; En Los Pasos de mi Padre" by Tito Puente; "Bésame Mucho" from Un Bolero Por Favor by Consuelo Velázquez performed by Nana Mouskouri	"Sarabande" by George Frideric Handel	
2004–2005	"Bésame Mucho" from Un Bolero Por Favor by Consuelo Velázquez performed by Nana Mouskouri	"Sarabande" by George Frideric Handel	
2003–2004	"Pennsylvania 6-5000"; "That's All Right"; "This Cat's on a Hot Tin Roof"	"Hasta Que te Conoci"; "De Mis Manos"; "Voy a Conquistarte"; "Que Viva la Alegria" by Raúl Di Blasio	
2002–2003	Die Fledermaus by Johann Strauss II	Chocolat by Rachel Portman	

== Competitive highlights ==
- GP – Event of the ISU Grand Prix Series
- JGP – Event of the ISU Junior Grand Prix Series
- CS – Event of the ISU Challenger Series
- Medals at team events are awarded for the team result only. Individual placements at team events are listed in parentheses.

Competition placements at senior level
Season	2006–07	2007–08	2008–09	2009–10	2010–11	2011–12	2012–13	2013–14
Winter Olympics				2nd				1st
Winter Olympics (Team event)								3rd
World Championships	7th	6th	4th	2nd	1st	2nd	1st	
Four Continents Championships	4th	2nd	1st		1st	2nd	1st	
Grand Prix Final			3rd	1st	1st	1st	1st	1st
U.S. Championships	3rd	2nd	1st	1st	1st	1st	1st	1st
World Team Trophy						2nd (1st)		
GP NHK Trophy	4th			1st	1st		1st	1st
GP Rostelecom Cup			3rd	1st		1st		
GP Skate America		4th			1st	1st	1st	1st
GP Skate Canada	4th		1st					
GP Trophée Éric Bompard		3rd						
Nebelhorn Trophy				1st				
U.S. Classic								1st

Competition placements at junior level
Season	2002–03	2003–04	2004–05	2005–06
World Junior Championships		13th		3rd
Junior Grand Prix Final				2nd
U.S. Championships	7th	2nd		1st
JGP Andorra				2nd
JGP Bulgaria				1st
JGP Czech Republic		4th		
JGP Germany	8th			
JGP Japan		4th		
JGP Romania			3rd	
JGP Serbia	6th		3rd	

== Detailed results (with Meryl Davis) ==
ISU personal bests in the +3/-3 GOE System (from 2010–11)
Segment	Type	Score	Event
Total	TSS	195.52	2014 Winter Olympics
Short dance	TSS	78.89	2014 Winter Olympics
Short dance	TES	39.72	2014 Winter Olympics
Short dance	PCS	39.17	2014 Winter Olympics
Free dance	TSS	116.63	2014 Winter Olympics
Free dance	TES	57.50	2014 Winter Olympics
Free dance	PCS	59.13	2014 Winter Olympics

- Small medals for the short program and free skating are only awarded at ISU Championships.
- Medals at team events are awarded for the team result only. Individual placements at team events are listed in parentheses.

=== Senior level ===
Results in the 2006–07 season
Date	Event	CD		OD		FD		Total	
Date	Event	P	Score	P	Score	P	Score	P	Score
Nov 3–5, 2006	2006 Skate Canada International	8	25.53	3	52.30	4	84.83	4	162.66
Dec 1–3, 2006	(Japan) 2006 NHK Trophy	4	29.98	4	52.86	4	86.65	4	169.49
Jan 21–28, 2007	(United States) 2007 U.S. Championships	2	36.18	4	54.72	3	93.21	3	184.11
Feb 7–10, 2007	(United States) 2007 Four Continents Championships	3	33.68	4	54.66	5	91.35	4	179.69
Mar 20–25, 2007	(Japan) 2007 World Championships	10	31.15	8	55.82	7	92.17	7	179.14

Results in the 2007–08 season
Date	Event	CD		OD		FD		Total	
Date	Event	P	Score	P	Score	P	Score	P	Score
Oct 26–28, 2007	(United States) 2007 Skate America	5	30.16	4	52.84	4	85.79	4	168.79
Nov 15–18, 2007	(France) 2007 Trophée Éric Bompard	4	31.74	3	55.25	3	89.22	3	176.21
Jan 20–27, 2008	(United States) 2008 U.S. Championships	2	40.59	2	62.69	2	103.54	2	206.82
Feb 11–17, 2008	(South Korea) 2008 Four Continents Championships	2	37.36	2	61.93	2	100.16	2	199.45
Mar 16–23, 2008	(Sweden) 2008 World Championships	7	34.80	7	60.36	6	96.03	6	191.19

Results in the 2008–09 season
Date	Event	CD		OD		FD		Total	
Date	Event	P	Score	P	Score	P	Score	P	Score
Oct 31 – Nov 2, 2008	2008 Skate Canada International	1	34.29	1	56.36	1	88.24	1	178.89
Nov 20–23, 2008	2008 Cup of Russia	3	35.77	8	43.68	2	91.16	3	170.61
Dec 10–14, 2008	(South Korea) 2008–09 Grand Prix Final	—N/a	—N/a	5	55.89	3	92.15	3	148.04
Jan 18–25, 2009	(United States) 2009 U.S. Championships	1	39.93	1	61.93	1	99.82	1	201.68
Feb 2–8, 2009	(Canada) 2009 Four Continents Championships	2	35.23	2	60.42	1	96.74	1	192.39
Mar 24–28, 2009	(United States) 2009 World Championships	4	37.73	3	62.60	3	100.03	4	200.36

Results in the 2009–10 season
Date	Event	CD		OD		FD		Total	
Date	Event	P	Score	P	Score	P	Score	P	Score
Sep 23–26, 2009	(Germany) Nebelhorn Trophy	1	37.62	1	62.08	1	100.76	1	200.46
Oct 22–25, 2009	(Russia) 2009 Rostelecom Cup	1	37.87	1	62.21	1	101.02	1	201.10
Nov 5–8, 2009	(Japan) 2009 NHK Trophy	1	38.09	1	63.09	1	100.79	1	201.97
Dec 3–6, 2009	(Japan) 2009–10 Grand Prix Final	—N/a	—N/a	1	65.80	2	103.64	1	169.44
Jan 14–24, 2010	(United States) 2010 U.S. Championships	1	45.42	1	68.11	1	108.76	1	222.29
Feb 14–27, 2010	(Canada) 2010 Winter Olympics	3	41.47	2	67.08	2	107.19	2	215.74
Mar 22–28, 2010	(Italy) 2010 World Championships	2	43.25	2	69.29	1	110.49	2	223.03

Results in the 2010–11 season
Date	Event	SD		FD		Total	
Date	Event	P	Score	P	Score	P	Score
Oct 22–24, 2010	(Japan) 2010 NHK Trophy	1	66.97	1	98.24	1	165.21
Nov 12–14, 2010	(United States) 2010 Skate America	1	63.62	1	93.06	1	156.68
Dec 9–12, 2010	(China) 2010–11 Grand Prix Final	1	68.64	1	102.94	1	171.58
Jan 22–30, 2011	(United States) 2011 U.S. Championships	1	76.04	1	109.44	1	185.48
Feb 15–20, 2011	(Taiwan) 2011 Four Continents Championships	2	69.01	1	103.02	1	172.03
Apr 24 – May 1, 2011	(Japan) 2011 World Championships	2	73.76	1	111.51	1	185.27

Results in the 2011–12 season
Date	Event	SD		FD		Total	
Date	Event	P	Score	P	Score	P	Score
Oct 21–23, 2011	(United States) 2011 Skate America	1	70.33	1	107.74	1	178.07
Nov 25–27, 2011	(Russia) 2011 Rostelecom Cup	1	69.94	1	109.12	1	179.06
Dec 8–11, 2011	(Canada) 2011–12 Grand Prix Final	1	76.17	2	112.38	1	188.55
Jan 22–29, 2012	(United States) 2012 U.S. Championships	1	76.89	1	114.65	1	191.54
Feb 7–12, 2012	(United States) 2012 Four Continents Championships	1	72.15	2	107.25	2	179.40
Mar 26 – Apr 1, 2012	(France) 2012 World Championships	2	70.98	2	107.64	2	178.62
Apr 19–22, 2012	(Japan) 2012 World Team Trophy	1	72.18	1	111.18	2 (1)	183.36

Results in the 2012–13 season
Date	Event	SD		FD		Total	
Date	Event	P	Score	P	Score	P	Score
Oct 19–21, 2012	(United States) 2012 Skate America	1	71.39	1	104.98	1	176.28
Nov 23–25, 2012	(Japan) 2012 NHK Trophy	1	69.86	1	108.62	1	178.48
Dec 6–9, 2012	(Russia) 2012–13 Grand Prix Final	1	73.20	1	110.19	1	183.39
Jan 19–27, 2013	(United States) 2013 U.S. Championships	1	79.02	1	118.42	1	197.44
Feb 8–11, 2013	(Japan) 2013 Four Continents Championships	2	74.68	1	112.68	1	187.36
Mar 11–17, 2013	(Canada) 2013 World Championships	1	77.12	1	112.44	1	189.56

Results in the 2013–14 season
Date	Event	SD		FD		Total	
Date	Event	P	Score	P	Score	P	Score
Sep 11–15, 2013	(United States) 2013 U.S International Classic	1	73.67	1	110.02	1	183.69
Oct 18–20, 2013	(United States) 2013 Skate America	1	75.70	1	112.53	1	188.23
Nov 8–10, 2013	(Japan) 2013 NHK Trophy	1	73.70	1	112.95	1	186.65
Dec 5–8, 2013	(Japan) 2013–14 Grand Prix Final	1	77.66	1	113.69	1	191.35
Jan 5–12, 2014	(United States) 2014 U.S. Championships	1	80.69	1	119.50	1	200.19
Feb 6–9, 2014	(Russia) 2014 Winter Olympics (Team event)	1	75.98	1	114.34	3	—N/a
Feb 6–22, 2014	(Russia) 2014 Winter Olympics	1	78.89	1	116.63	1	195.52

=== Junior level ===
Results in the 2002–03 season
Date	Event	CD		OD		FD		Total	
Date	Event	P	Score	P	Score	P	Score	P	Score
Sep 12–15, 2002	2002 JGP Serbia	8	3.2	6	3.6	6	6.0	6	12.8
Oct 9–12, 2002	2002 JGP Germany	10	—N/a	8	—N/a	7	—N/a	8	15.8
Jan 12–19, 2003	(United States) 2003 U.S. Championships (Junior)	7	—N/a	7	—N/a	6	—N/a	7	12.8

Results in the 2003–04 season
Date	Event	CD		OD		FD		Total	
Date	Event	P	Score	P	Score	P	Score	P	Score
Oct 2–5, 2003	2003 JGP Czech Republic	4	—N/a	4	—N/a	4	—N/a	4	8.0
Oct 16–19, 2003	2003 JGP Japan	3	—N/a	4	—N/a	4	—N/a	4	7.6
Jan 3–11, 2004	(United States) 2004 U.S. Championships (Junior)	2	—N/a	2	—N/a	2	—N/a	2	4.0
Feb 29 – Mar 7, 2004	(Netherlands) 2004 World Junior Championships	6	—N/a	13	—N/a	12	—N/a	13	22.2

Results in the 2004–05 season
Date	Event	CD		OD		FD		Total	
Date	Event	P	Score	P	Score	P	Score	P	Score
Sep 22–25, 2004	2004 JGP Serbia	3	34.32	3	52.05	3	78.20	3	164.57
Oct 12–17, 2004	2004 JGP Romania	3	34.40	2	52.12	3	75.68	3	162.20

Results in the 2005–06 season
Date	Event	CD		OD		FD		Total	
Date	Event	P	Score	P	Score	P	Score	P	Score
Sep 7–11, 2005	2005 JGP Andorra	2	33.25	2	55.34	2	82.62	2	171.21
Sep 29 – Oct 2, 2005	2005 JGP Bulgaria	2	33.50	1	52.25	1	78.90	1	164.65
Nov 24–27, 2005	(Czech Republic) 2005–06 Junior Grand Prix Final	3	31.94	2	50.90	2	78.01	2	160.85
Jan 7–15, 2006	(United States) 2006 U.S. Championships (Junior)	1	35.35	1	58.06	1	85.45	1	178.86
Mar 6–12, 2006	(Slovenia) 2006 World Junior Championships	3	33.31	4	52.74	2	81.15	3	167.20

== Dancing with the Stars ==
On March 4, 2014, White was announced as one of the contestants on the 18th season of Dancing with the Stars. He was paired with professional dancer Sharna Burgess. He competed against Meryl Davis, who was also cast to take part on the 18th season of the show. Despite receiving high scores and praise from the judges week to week, White and Burgess were eliminated during the season's semifinals, finishing in 5th place.

Charlie White - Dancing with the Stars (season 18)
Week	Dance	Music	Judges' scores (Note: Individual judges' scores are listed in the following order: Carrie Ann Inaba, Len Goodman, Bruno Tonioli.)			Total score	Result
1	Contemporary	"Let Her Go" — Passenger	9	9	9	27	Safe
2	Tango	"Addicted to You" — Avicii	9	7	9	25	Safe
3	Jive	"Happy" — Pharrell Williams	9	9	9	36 (Note: Charlie also received a score of 9 from guest judge Robin Roberts.)	Safe
4 (Note: For week 4, the couples switched professional partners. Charlie was paired up with Peta Murgatroyd.)	Rumba	"Wildest Moments" — Jessie Ware	7	8	9	33 (Note: Charlie also received a score of 9 from guest judge Julianne Hough.)	Safe
5	Jazz	"Supercalifragilisticexpialidocious" — Julie Andrews & Dick Van Dyke	9	10	9	37 (Note: Charlie also received a score of 9 from guest judge Donny Osmond.)	Safe
6	Cha-cha-cha	"Gonna Make You Sweat (Everybody Dance Now)" — C+C Music Factory	9	9	9	36 (Note: Charlie also received a score of 9 from guest judge Redfoo.)	Safe
7	Paso doble	"Sail" — Awolnation	9	8	9	36 (Note: Charlie also received a score of 10 from guest judge Ricky Martin.)	Safe
7	Freestyle (Team dance)	"La Copa de la Vida" — Ricky Martin	8	8	9	35 (Note: Charlie's team also received a score of 10 from guest judge Ricky Martin.)	Safe
8	Quickstep	"My Heart Goes Boom" — Miss Li	10	10	10	40 (Note: Charlie also received a score of 10 from guest judge Abby Lee Miller.)	Safe
8	Contemporary (Celebrity Dance Duel)	"Stay with Me" — Sam Smith	9	9	10	38 (Note: Charlie was part of a paired dance with Candace Cameron Bure, and they both also received a score of 10 from guest judge Abby Lee Miller.)	Safe
9	Foxtrot	"New York, New York" — Frank Sinatra	10	10	10	40 (Note: Charlie also received a score of 10 from guest judge Kenny Ortega.)	Eliminated
9	Samba	"Mo Money Mo Problems" — The Notorious B.I.G.	9	9	9	30 (Note: Charlie also received a score of 9 from guest judge Kenny Ortega.)	Eliminated

== See also ==
- List of Jewish Olympic medalists
