= Greg Zuerlein (figure skater) =

American ice dancer (born 1988)

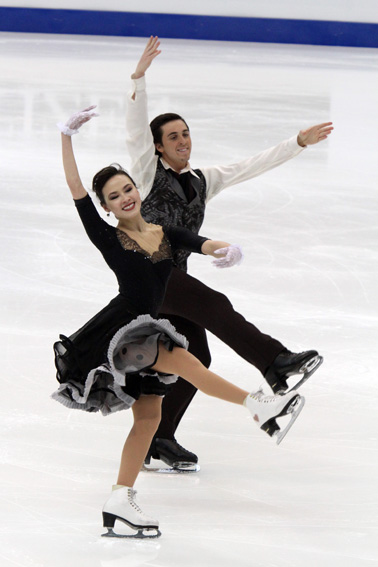
- Madison Chock and Greg Zuerlein in 2011.

Personal information
- Born: October 26, 1988 (age 37) Cincinnati, Ohio, U.S.
- Home town: Northville, Michigan, U.S.
- Height: 5 ft 7 in (1.70 m)

Figure skating career
- Country: United States
- Discipline: Ice dance
- Partner: Madison Chock (2007–11); Anastasia Olsen (2002–06)
- Began skating: 1993
- Retired: June 7, 2011

Medal record
U.S. Championships
Bronze medal – third place	2011 Greensboro	Ice dance
World Junior Championships
Gold medal – first place	2009 Sofia	Ice dance
Junior Grand Prix Final
Gold medal – first place	2008–09 Goyang	Ice dance

Greg Zuerlein (born October 26, 1988) is an American former ice dancer. With Madison Chock, he was the 2009 World Junior champion, 2008 JGP Final champion, and 2011 U.S. national bronze medalist. They competed together from 2006 to 2011.

== Personal life ==
Zuerlein was born in Cincinnati, Ohio. He enrolled in Schoolcraft College. His older sister competed in synchronized skating at Junior Synchro Worlds. In March 2014, Zuerlein married Philippe Maitrot, who is originally from France.

== Career ==
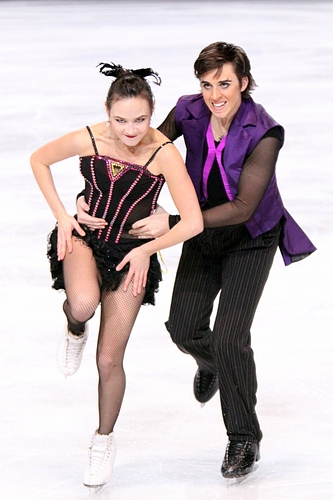
Chock and Zuerlein at the 2010 Trophée Éric Bompard

=== Competitive career ===
Zuerlein began skating at the age of four. He competed in single skating at the 2002 and 2003 U.S. junior championships on the juvenile level. He then took up ice dancing. Zuerlein skated with Anastasia Olsen from 2002 through 2006. They won the bronze medal in intermediate dance in 2005 and placed 12th at the novice level at the 2006 U.S. Championships.

Zuerlein teamed up with Madison Chock in June 2006. They placed fifth in the novice division at the 2007 U.S. Championships. They began working with Igor Shpilband and Marina Zueva in 2007.

Making their Junior Grand Prix debut, Chock and Zuerlein won gold in September 2007 in Tallinn, Estonia. With a bronze medal at their second event, in Chemnitz, Germany, they qualified to the ISU Junior Grand Prix Final in Gdańsk, Poland, where they placed fifth. They received the junior bronze medal at the 2008 U.S. Championships.

==== 2008–09 season: World Junior champion and Junior Grand Prix Final gold ====
In December 2008, Chock and Zuerlein won gold at the Junior Grand Prix Final in Goyang, South Korea.

They won the junior title in January at the 2009 U.S. Championships. They capped off their season by becoming the 2009 World Junior champions in Sofia, Bulgaria.

==== 2009–10 season ====
Chock and Zuerlein moved up to the senior level. Making their Grand Prix debut, they placed sixth at the 2009 Skate America and eighth at the 2009 Cup of China. They finished fifth at their senior national debut in January 2010. Later that month, they were sent to the 2010 Four Continents Championships in Jeonju, South Korea, where they had the same result.

==== 2010–11 season ====
Chock and Zuerlein won their first senior Grand Prix medal, bronze, at the 2010 Skate Canada International and followed it up with bronze at the 2010 Trophée Éric Bompard. They won their first senior national medal, bronze, at the 2011 U.S. Championships. After placing fifth again at the 2011 Four Continents Championships, they finished ninth in their first and only appearance at the World Championships, setting personal best scores in both segments of the competition.

On June 7, 2011, Chock and Zuerlein announced the end of their five-year partnership; Zuerlein retired from competition, while Chock continued competing.

=== Coaching career ===
After retiring, Zuerlein worked as an assistant coach to Igor Shpilband for many years. In 2022, Zuerlein opened the Michigan Ice Dance Academy with Charlie White and Tanith Belbin White. Their current and former teams include:

- Emily Bratti / Ian Somerville
- Molly Cesanek / Yehor Yehorov
- Caroline Green / Michael Parsons
- Annabelle Morozov / Jeffrey Chen
- Katarina Wolfkostin / Jeffrey Chen
- Katarina Wolfkostin / Dimitry Tsarevski

== Programs ==
=== Ice dance with Madison Chock ===
Season	Original dance	Free dance	Exhibition
2006–2007		My Sweet and Tender Beast by Eugen Doga	
2007–2008	Dark Eyes	West Side Story by Leonard Bernstein	
2008–2009	Minnie the Moocher by The Dancing Fool	The Phantom of the Opera by Andrew Lloyd Webber	Come Together; Cryin' by Aerosmith
2009–2010	Yema Ya; Agua Nile by Afro-Cuban Folk	La Vie est Belle performed by André Rieu	
	Short dance	Free dance	Exhibition
2010–2011	Milord; Padam Padam by Édith Piaf	Cabaret (soundtrack)	Nothing Else Matters performed by Santa Esmeralda; Satellite by J. Moreno feat. Santana

== Competitive highlights ==
=== Ice dance with Madison Chock ===
- GP – Event of the ISU Grand Prix Series
- JGP – Event of the ISU Junior Grand Prix Series

Competition placements at junior level
Season	2007–08	2008–09
World Junior Championships		1st
Junior Grand Prix Final	5th	1st
U.S. Championships	3rd	1st
JGP Estonia	1st	
JGP Germany	3rd	
JGP Great Britain		1st
JGP Italy		1st

Competition placements at senior level
Season	2009–10	2010–11
World Championships		9th
Four Continents Championships	5th	5th
U.S. Championships	5th	3rd
GP Cup of China	8th	
GP Skate America	6th	
GP Skate Canada		3rd
GP Trophée Éric Bompard		3rd

== Detailed results ==
=== Ice dance with Madison Chock ===
==== Senior level ====
Results in the 2009–10 season
Date	Event	CD		OD		FD		Total	
Date	Event	P	Score	P	Score	P	Score	P	Score
Oct 29 – Nov 1, 2009	2009 Cup of China	7	28.76	6	47.27	8	73.14	8	149.17
Nov 12–15, 2009	(United States) 2009 Skate America	7	28.88	8	44.55	5	80.49	6	153.92
Jan 14–24, 2010	(United States) 2010 U.S. Championships	6	34.12	5	54.87	5	88.49	5	177.48
Jan 27–30, 2010	(South Korea) 2010 Four Continents Championships	5	29.14	5	44.12	5	75.66	5	148.92

Results in the 2010–11 season
Date	Event	SD		FD		Total	
Date	Event	P	Score	P	Score	P	Score
Oct 28–31, 2010	2010 Skate Canada International	4	54.19	4	84.86	3	139.05
Nov 25–28, 2010	(France) 2010 Trophée Éric Bompard	3	58.09	3	80.39	3	138.48
Jan 22–30, 2011	(United States) 2011 U.S. Championships	3	61.74	3	92.88	3	154.62
Feb 15–20, 2011	(Taiwan) 2011 Four Continents Championships	6	57.14	5	85.30	5	142.44
Apr 25 – May 1, 2011	(Russia) 2011 World Championships	9	61.47	7	90.39	9	151.86

==== Junior level ====
Results in the 2007–08 season
Date	Event	CD		OD		FD		Total	
Date	Event	P	Score	P	Score	P	Score	P	Score
Sep 20–22, 2007	2007 JGP Estonia	1	29.37	1	50.37	1	71.25	1	150.99
Oct 10–13, 2007	2007 JGP Germany	2	30.27	4	47.77	2	74.59	3	152.63
Dec 6–9, 2007	(Poland) 2007–08 Junior Grand Prix Final	4	28.81	7	46.97	5	76.90	5	152.68
Aug 30 – Sep 2, 2008	(United States) 2008 U.S. Championships	4	29.92	1	53.03	3	78.45	3	161.40

Results in the 2008–09 season
Date	Event	CD		OD		FD		Total	
Date	Event	P	Score	P	Score	P	Score	P	Score
Sep 3–6, 2008	2008 JGP Italy	1	30.98	1	51.12	1	74.42	1	156.52
Oct 15–18, 2008	(United Kingdom) 2008 JGP Great Britain	3	31.23	1	53.78	1	83.07	1	168.08
Dec 10–14, 2008	(South Korea) 2008–09 Junior Grand Prix Final	—N/a	—N/a	1	51.84	1	79.31	1	131.15
Jan 18–25, 2009	(United States) 2009 U.S. Championships	1	52.89	1	52.89	1	82.02	1	167.81
Feb 22 – Mar 1, 2009	(Bulgaria) 2009 World Junior Championships	1	33.15	1	57.29	1	82.11	1	172.55
