= Roger Scannura =

- Born: June 19; Birzebbugia, Malta
- Genres: Flamenco
- Years active: 1991-Present
- Label: CD Baby
- Website: www.rogerscannura.ca

Roger Scannura is a flamenco guitarist and an exponent of nuevo flamenco.

== Life ==
Scannura was born on Malta. His early schooling began at the Franciscan Monastery of St. Theresa, where he was tutored in European history, Latin, fine art and art restoration. He has been immersed in music since early childhood and mastered the techniques and nuances of flamenco guitar while in Spain for 12 years under the auspices of Pepe Habichuela and other gypsy masters. He has toured Europe and North America as a soloist and as a music director for several flamenco dance companies. He is also a founder of a small Toronto-based dance company, Ritmo Flamenco. Scannura with his group has performed for prime ministers, dignitaries as well as an assortment of celebrities, including Russell Crowe and Sting. Scannura has recorded six CDs of original flamenco music encompassing both traditional and modern styles.

== Reviews ==
JazzReview.com reviews Encore!:

There are a number of impressive guitarists courageous enough to tackle flamenco. Few are as convincing and awe inspiring as Roger Scannura. Encore is a sampler from each of the Toronto-based Malta native’s four releases. Each, judging by this, must be a stunner, as there is nothing here that qualifies as anything less.

The opening “Burnin’ Up” offers handclaps, dancing (Ritmo Flamenco is a Toronto based Flamenco dance company), violin and bass – at least. Unfortunately, there is no credit given to the accompanying players on the disc. The violinist is especially stunning. The guitarist, it goes without saying, is breathtaking. Through the eight tunes that comprise this delightful disc, feet play a prominent role. As with all authentic flamenco, it is a marriage of the guitar and the dancer.

On the gorgeous ballad of “Marissa,” solo guitar takes center stage, though the robust dancing is never tucked too far into the background. The melodic “Summerwine” is heart wrenchingly beautiful. As on “Marissa,” the dancing is accompanist to the player. “Angelica” is a lilting number that showcases guitar work as fine as I’ve ever heard in any context. Again, with no personnel listing on the insert, the players go un-credited. The electric guitar that fills in here is superb.

The classic sounding “El Ritmo” is filled out with infectious clapping and dancing, and “Colmenares,” with its slinky flute accompaniment, along with the dancers, is hypnotic. The closing “Misterio” again is made the more magical by the addition of the violinist, percussion and dancing. This is a must-have for fans of flamenco music.

Reviewed by: Mark E. Gallo

"...a gifted composer whose music is as beautiful as it is haunting." -The Globe and Mail

"Rarely is Flamenco guitar played so eloquently with just the right amount of passion and grace." -20th Century Guitar Magazine

== Discography ==
| Year | Album name | Instruments |
|---|---|---|
| 1991 | Spanish Dance | Solo guitar |
| 1994 | Ritmo Flamenco | Solo guitar |
| 1996 | Saracen | Guitar; Percussion; Flute; Sax |
| 1998 | Medina | Guitar; Vocals; Percussion |
| 2000 | Misterio | Guitar; Vocals; Violin; Mandola; Percussion |
| 2003 | Encore! | Guitar; Violin; Mandola; Percussion |
| 2005 | Noche Flamenca | Guitar; Violin; Percussion |
