= Chloe Lewis =

Chloe Lewis may refer to:

- Chloe Lewis (ER), character on American fictional TV series, ER
- Chloe Lewis (figure skater), American ice dancer
- Chloe Lewis (TOWIE), participant in British semi-scripted reality series, The Only Way is Essex
- Chloe Lewis, musician formerly in The Morning Of
