= Eva Pate =

American ice dancer (born 2000)

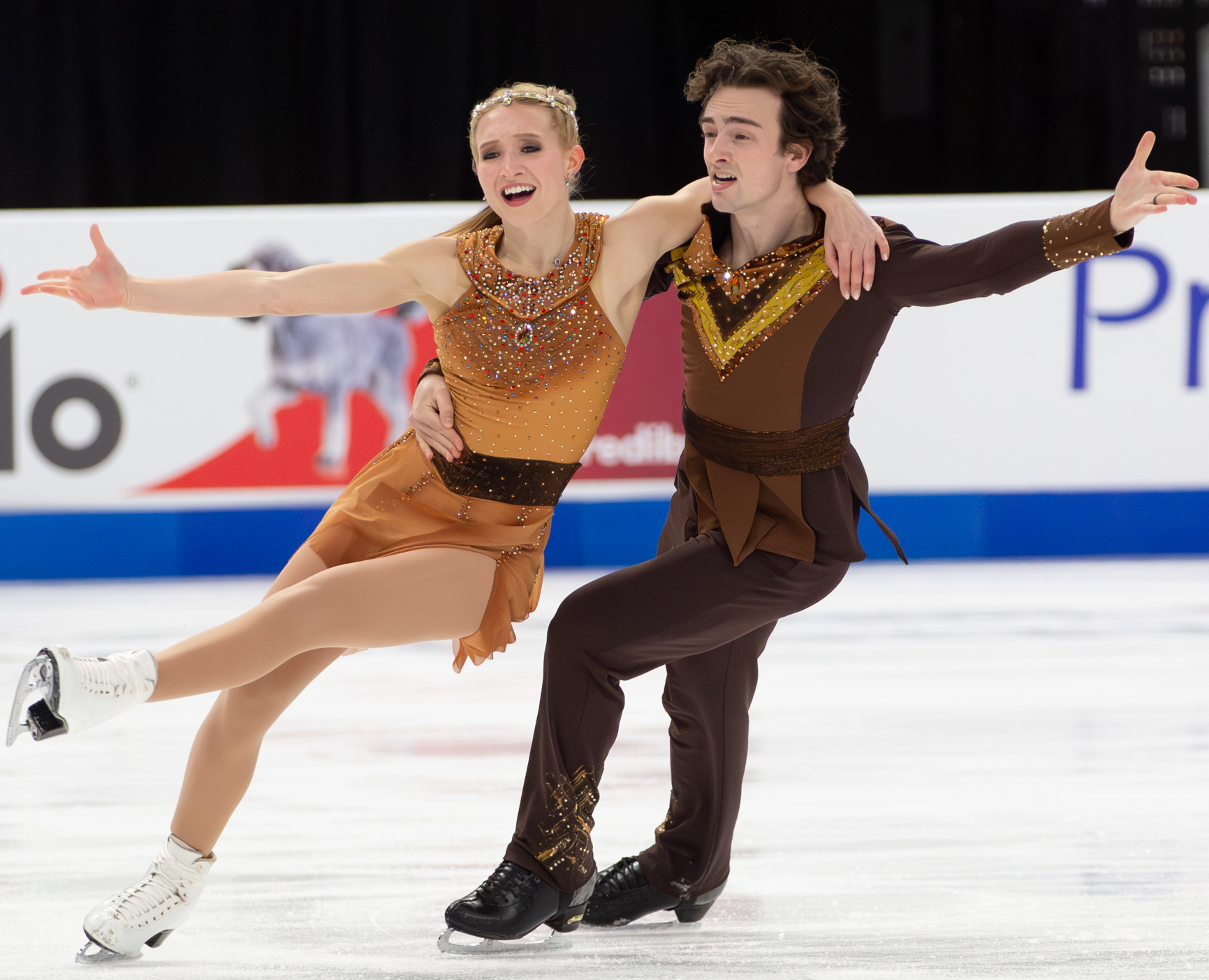
- Pate with Logan Bye at the 2026 U.S. Championships

Personal information
- Born: May 11, 2000 (age 26) Cleveland, Ohio, U.S.
- Home town: Strongsville, Ohio, U.S.
- Height: 5 ft 2 in (157 cm)

Figure skating career
- Country: United States
- Discipline: Ice dance
- Partner: Logan Bye
- Coach: Pasquale Camerlengo; Igor Shpilband; Natalia Deller; Adrienne Lenda
- Skating club: Cleveland Skating Club
- Began skating: 2006

Eva Pate (born May 11, 2000) is an American ice dancer. With her skating partner and husband, Logan Bye, she is a six-time ISU Challenger Series medalist.

== Personal life ==
Pate was born on May 11, 2000, in Cleveland, Ohio, to parents Jenny and David Pate. She has a younger brother, Gavin, who plays hockey at Eastern Michigan University. Pate is a graduate of Strongsville High School and currently attends Cuyahoga Community College.

Pate began dating Logan Bye in December 2018, before becoming on-ice partners. They became engaged in August 2022. They married in May 2024.

== Career ==
=== Early years ===
Pate began learning to skate at age five after attending an ice rink event with her Girl Scout troop. By age 10, she was on the verge of quitting skating, with practice becoming a "daily grind." At the suggestion of coach Janet Wene, she switched to the recently formed solo ice dance competition circuit, which had been started the year earlier to create more opportunities for girls in the sport who lacked partners. Pate reached the national championship in solo dance for the first time in 2012, finishing sixth. The following year, she placed fourth, winning the pewter medal. Watching the 2014 Winter Olympics in Sochi inspired Pate to definitively choose to focus on ice dance over gymnastics, which she had also been participating in until that point. For the 2014 solo dance championship, she won the pattern dance competition and qualified to the juvenile free dance competition for the first time, finishing fourth.

In November 2015, Pate was referred to Marina Zoueva, the coach of Olympic dance champions Virtue/Moir and Davis/White. For the next three years, she split time between Cleveland and Zoueva's base in Canton, Michigan before moving to train full-time in 2018. In January 2019 she left Zoueva to train with Igor Shpilband in Novi, Michigan.

==== 2019–20 season ====
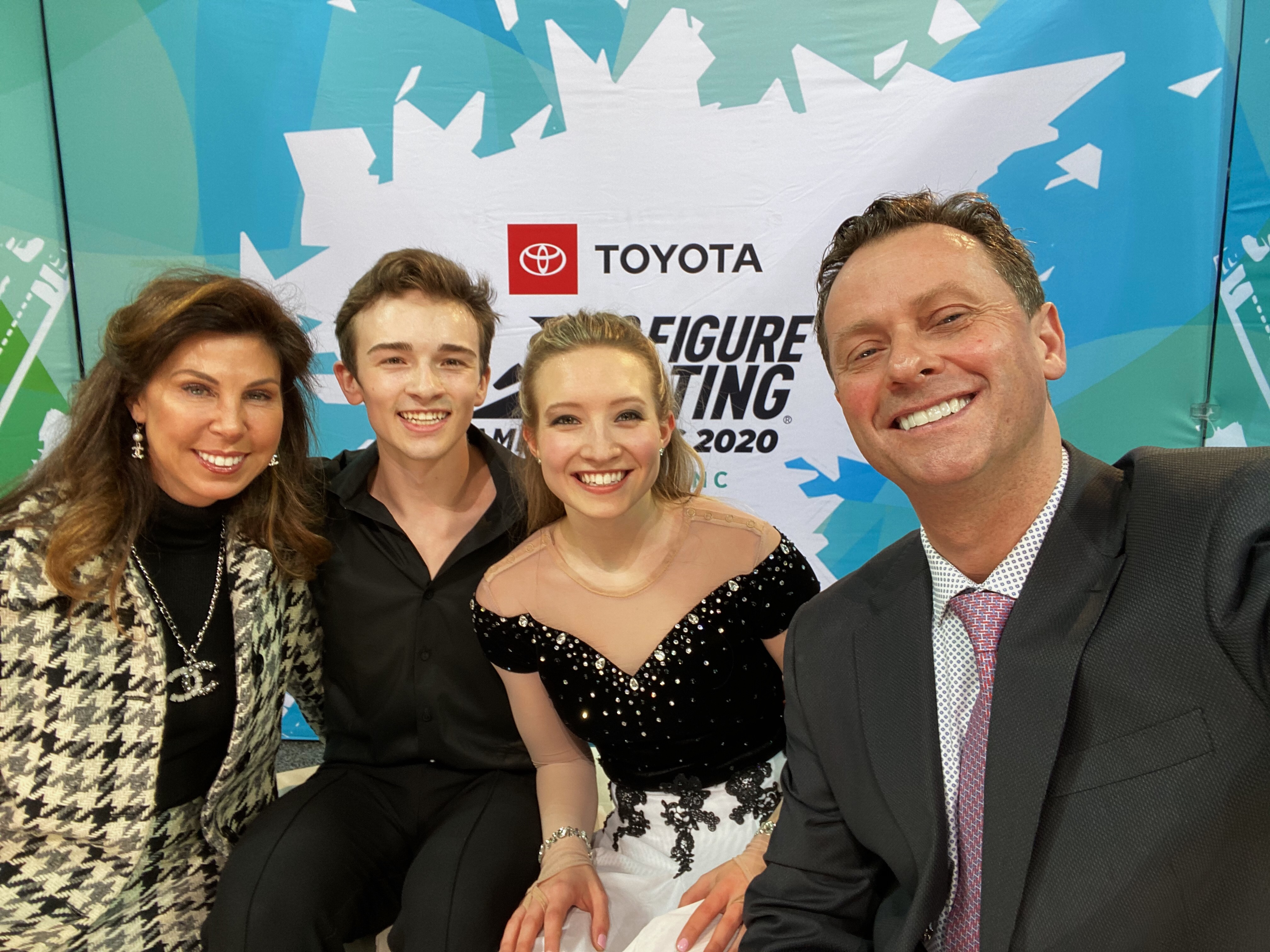
Adrienne Lenda (left), Logan Bye, Eva Pate, and Igor Sphilband (right) at the 2020 U.S. Championships

Pate had begun dating ice dancer Logan Bye in December 2018, and in June 2019, they decided to become an on-ice partnership, coached by Shpilband, Pasquale Camerlengo, Adrienne Lenda, and Natalia Deller in Novi, Michigan.

Pate/Bye made their domestic debut at the Midwestern Sectional Dance Challenge, where they won the silver medal. They went on to win the U.S. Ice Dance Final in Hyannis, Massachusetts. This, in turn, qualified them for their debut at the 2020 U.S. Championships, where they finished in seventh place.

==== 2020–21 season ====
Due to the onset of the COVID-19 pandemic, competition opportunities were limited both domestically and internationally for the 2020–21 season. Pate/Bye were assigned to make their Grand Prix debut at the 2020 Skate America in Las Vegas, attended primarily by American skaters due to travel restrictions pandemic. They finished in seventh place.

At the U.S. Championships later that season, they finished in seventh place as well.

==== 2021–22 season ====
With the resumption of a more normal international calendar, Pate/Bye made their season debut at the Lake Placid Ice Dance International, where they finished in fifth place. They were assigned the U.S. Classic where they earned their first international bronze medal. Pate said of the occasion that "we have been training really hard every day and just being able to be out here and put out a clean skate makes me feel really proud of us." Making their debut in the Challenger series, they finished in seventh place at the 2021 Warsaw Cup.

At the U.S. Championships, Pate/Bye finished in eighth place.

==== 2022–23 season ====
Pate/Bye began their season at the Lake Placid Ice Dance International, where they won the silver medal. They were given two Challenger circuit assignments after that, first winning the silver medal at the 2022 U.S International Classic, held in Lake Placid. They set new personal bests in the process, with Bye adding that "we wanted to put out what we've been training, so I thought it went well." They went on to win a second silver medal at the 2022 Nepela Memorial. The team received their second ever Grand Prix assignment at the 2022 Grand Prix de France. Pate described her reaction to the news: "My mom called me, and she was like, ‘You're going to France!’ and I'm like, ‘that’s crazy!’ I was so excited." They finished fifth at the event. Pate/Bye were selected to compete in a third Challenger circuit assignment, the 2022 Golden Spin of Zagreb, where they earned a season's best free dance score and finished in fourth place.

Concluding the season at the 2023 U.S. Championships, Pate/Bye finished eighth for the second consecutive year.

==== 2023–24 season ====
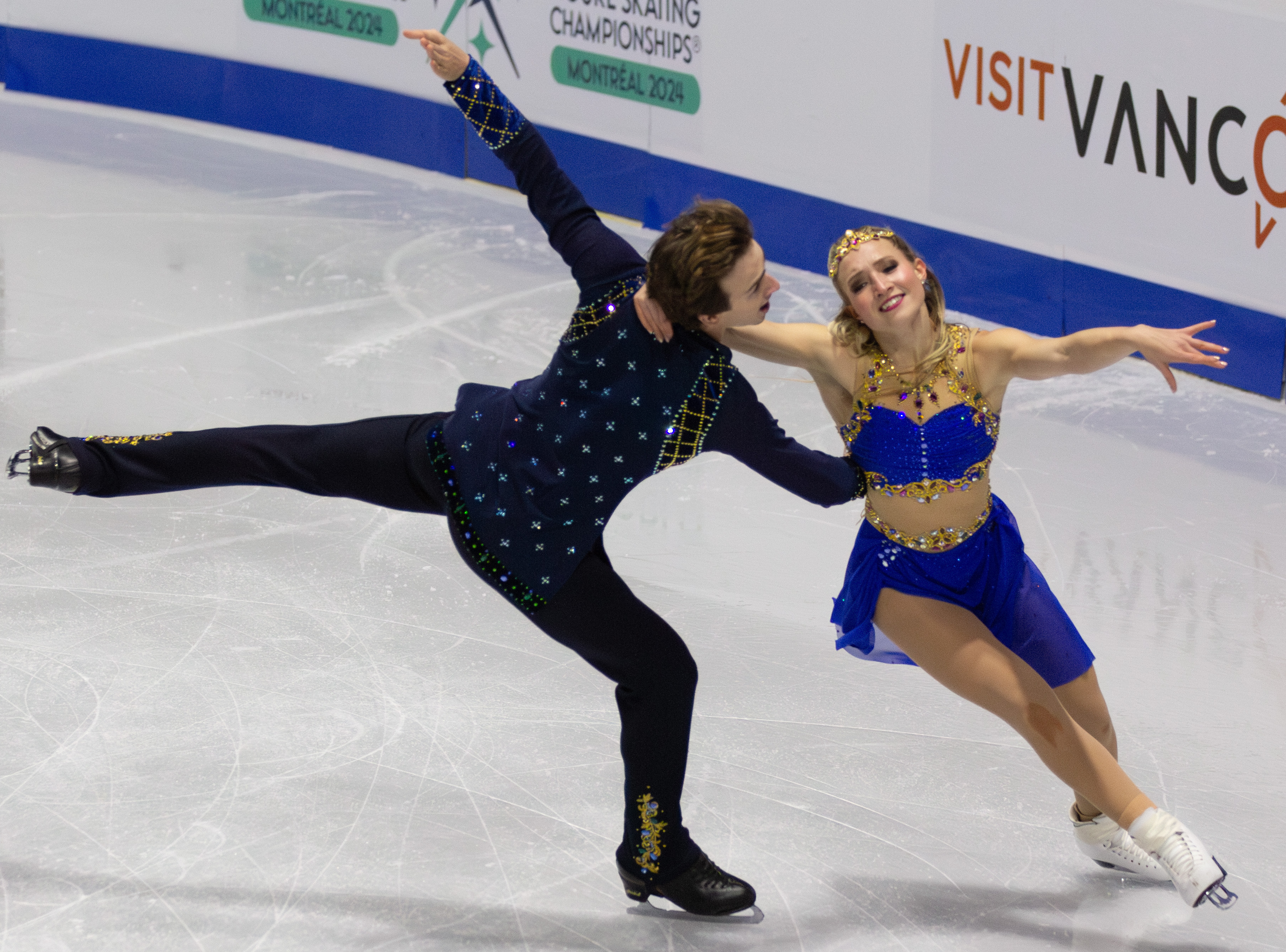
Pate and Bye at 2023 Skate Canada International

Pate/Bye won the bronze medal at the Lake Placid Ice Dance International in August, before competing at the 2023 Autumn Classic International. They set new personal bests at the competition and won the gold medal. This was the team's first international gold medal. Given two assignments on the Grand Prix assignments, they finished sixth at the 2023 Skate Canada International and fourth at the 2023 Cup of China.

At the 2024 U.S. Figure Skating Championships, Pate/Bye finished in fifth place. "We just need to get stronger because I feel like our technical ability is there," said Pate after the free dance. "It’s just the little in between things that could get better and help us more in the future.”

==== 2024–25 season ====
Pate/Bye began the season by winning bronze at the 2024 Lake Placid Ice Dance International and at the 2024 CS Trophée Métropole Nice Côte d'Azur. Going on to compete on the 2024–25 Grand Prix circuit, the team finished ninth at the 2024 Grand Prix de France and seventh at the 2024 Finlandia Trophy.

At the 2025 U.S. Figure Skating Championships, Pate/Bye finished in eighth place.

==== 2025–26 season ====
Pate/Bye started the season by placing fourth at the 2025 Lake Placid Ice Dance International. They then went on to win gold at the 2025 CS Lombardia Trophy. Selected to compete on the 2025–26 Grand Prix circuit, finishing seventh at the 2025 Grand Prix de France.

In November, Pate/Bye won the gold medal at the 2025 Ice Challenge and finished fourth at the 2025 CS Tallinn Trophy. Two months later, they competed at the 2026 U.S. Championships, finishing in eleventh place.

== Programs ==
=== Ice dance with Logan Bye ===
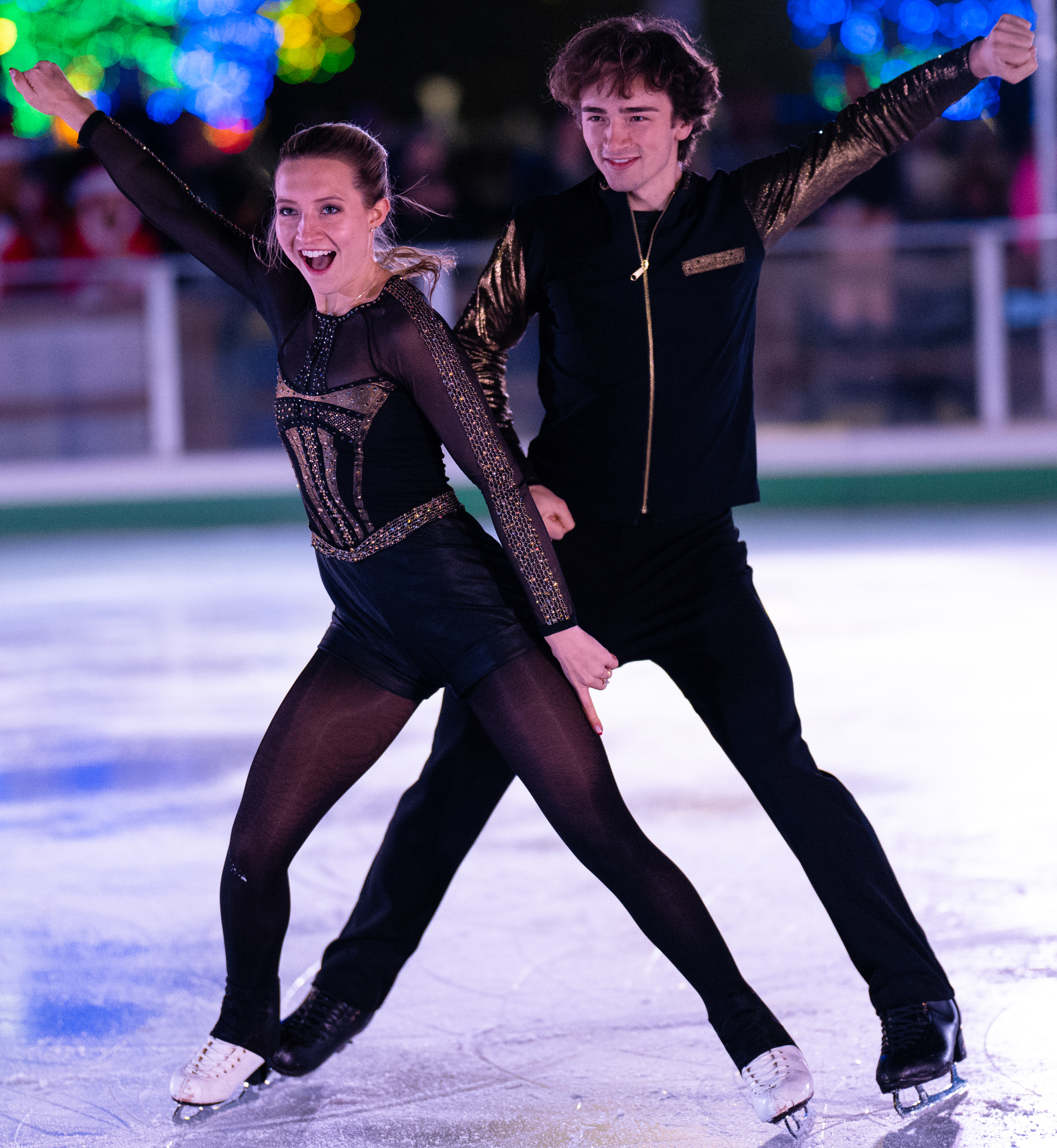
Pate and Bye at Cleveland Public Square in 2023

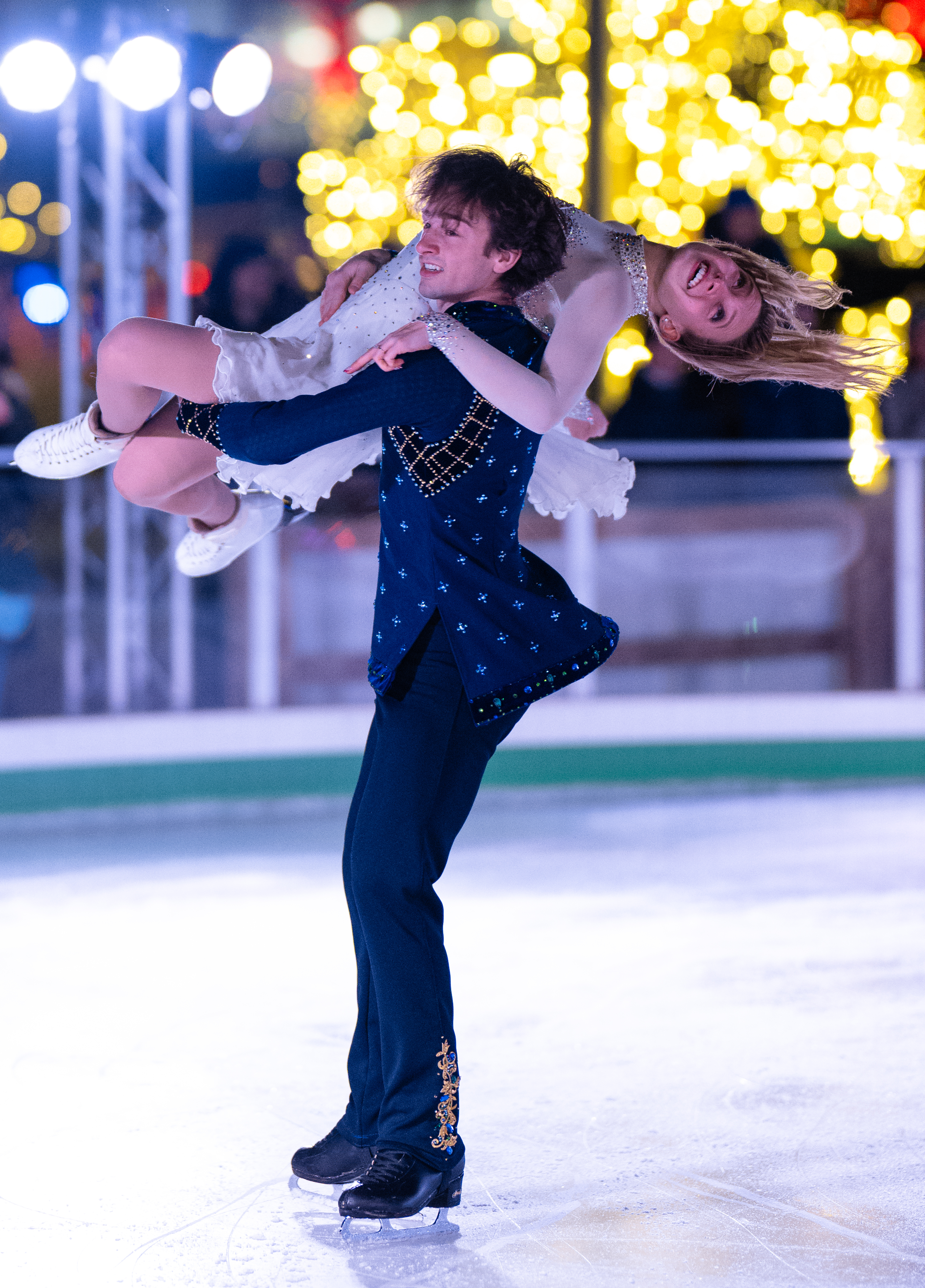
Pate and Bye performing a lift at Cleveland Public Square in 2023

Season	Rhythm dance	Free dance	Exhibition
2019–2020	Anything Goes performed by New Broadway Orchestra; It's De-Lovely (from Anything Goes) performed by Sarah Vaughan choreo. by Igor Shpilband, Pasquale Camerlengo	Say Something by A Great Big World and Christina Aguilera; Primavera by Ludovico Einaudi choreo. by Igor Shpilband, Pasquale Camerlengo	
2020–2021	Motown: The Musical; My Girl; I Want You Back – ABC – The Love You Save; Stop! In the Name of Love by Motown: The Musical Original Broadway Cast choreo. by Igor Shpilband, Pasquale Camerlengo	Say Something by A Great Big World and Christina Aguilera; Primavera by Ludovico Einaudi choreo. by Igor Shpilband, Pasquale Camerlengo	
2021–2022	Cry Me a River by Justin Timberlake; Bye Bye Bye by NSYNC choreo. by Igor Shpilband, Pasquale Camerlengo, Charlie White, Renee Petkovski	The Hunger Games: The Hanging Tree by James Newton Howard, feat. Jennifer Lawrence; Abraham's Daughter by Arcade Fire; Everybody Wants to Rule the World performed by Lorde choreo. by Igor Shpilband, Pasquale Camerlengo, Charlie White, Renee Petkovski	
2022–2023	Samba: Beautiful Creatures (from Rio 2) by Barbatuques, Andy García, and Rita Moreno; Rhumba: Fly Love by Jamie Foxx; Samba: Real in Rio (from Rio) performed by Rio Singers choreo. by Igor Shpilband, Pasquale Camerlengo, Renee Petkovski, Oksana Zolotarevskaya, Zachary Donohue	Reel Around the Sun (from Riverdance) by Bill Whelan choreo. by Igor Shpilband, Pasquale Camerlengo, Renee Petkovski, Oksana Zolotarevskaya, Zachary Donohue	Oops!... I Did It Again by Britney Spears; Pop; Bye Bye Bye by NSYNC choreo. by Igor Shpilband, Pasquale Camerlengo, Charlie White, Renee Petkovski
2023–2024	My Prerogative by Bobby Brown; Walk This Way by Run-DMC & Aerosmith choreo. by Igor Shpilband, Pasquale Camerlengo, Renee Petkovski, Randi Strong	Polovtsian Dances (from Prince Igor) by Alexander Borodin choreo. by Igor Shpilband, Pasquale Camerlengo, Renee Petkovski, Randi Strong	The Hunger Games; The Hanging Tree by James Newton Howard, feat. Jennifer Lawrence; Everybody Wants to Rule the World performed by Lorde choreo. by Igor Shpilband, Pasquale Camerlengo, Charlie White, Renee Petkovski
2024–2025	Le Freak by Chic; Car Wash by Rose Royce; Shake Your Groove Thing by Peaches & Herb choreo. by Igor Shpilband, Pasquale Camerlengo, Renee Petkovski	City of Lights: Evening - Meeting the Millionaire” by Carl Davis & City Lights Orchestra; City Lights: Overture - Unveiling the Statue by Carl Davis & City Lights Orchestra; Georgia/The Dancehall by Charlie Chaplin; The Reel Chaplin: A Symphonic Adventure, Pt. 2/The Chaplin Revue by Carl Davis & The City of Prague Philharmonic Orchestra; Limelight by rank Chacksfield and His Orchestra; Hungarian Rhapsody No. 2 in C-Sharp Minor by Franz Liszt performed by Erich Kunzel & Cincinnati Pops Orchestra choreo. by Igor Shpilband, Pasquale Camerlengo, Renee Petkovski; Polovtsian Dances (from Prince Igor) by Alexander Borodin choreo. by Igor Shpilband, Pasquale Camerlengo, Renee Petkovski, Randi Strong	
2025–2026	Enter Sandman by Metallica; Thunderstruck by AC/DC choreo. by Angelika Krylova, Pasquale Camerlengo, Igor Shpilband, Renee Petkovski	The Lion King by Hans Zimmer; Rafiki’s Fireflies; Stampede; Remember; King of Pride Rock / Circle of Life performed by Lebo M choreo. by Angelika Krylova, Pasquale Camerlengo, Igor Shpilband, Renee Petkovski	

== Competitive highlights ==
=== Ice dance with Logan Bye ===
- GP – Event of the ISU Grand Prix Series
- CS – Event of the ISU Challenger Series
- TBD – Assigned
- WD – Withdrew from competition

Competition placements at senior level
Season	2019–20	2020–21	2021–22	2022–23	2023–24	2024–25	2025–26	2026–27
U.S. Championships	7th	7th	8th	8th	5th	8th	11th	
GP Cup of China					4th			7th
GP Finland						7th		
GP France				5th		9th	7th	6th
GP Skate America		7th						
GP Skate Canada					6th			
CS Autumn Classic					1st			
CS Golden Spin of Zagreb				4th				
CS Lombardia Trophy							1st	
CS Nepela Memorial				2nd				10th
CS Tallinn Trophy							4th	
CS Trophée Métropole Nice						3rd		
CS U.S. Classic			3rd	2nd				
CS Warsaw Cup			7th			4th		
Ice Challenge							1st	
Lake Placid Ice Dance International			5th	2nd	3rd	3rd	4th	2nd

== Detailed results ==
=== Ice dance with Logan Bye ===
ISU personal best scores in the +5/-5 GOE System
Segment	Type	Score	Event
Total	TSS	191.20	2023 CS Autumn Classic International
Rhythm dance	TSS	77.02	2023 CS Autumn Classic International
Rhythm dance	TES	44.69	2023 CS Autumn Classic International
Rhythm dance	PCS	32.33	2023 CS Autumn Classic International
Free dance	TSS	114.18	2023 CS Autumn Classic International
Free dance	TES	64.28	2023 CS Autumn Classic International
Free dance	PCS	49.90	2023 CS Autumn Classic International

Results in the 2019–20 season
Date	Event	RD		FD		Total	
Date	Event	P	Score	P	Score	P	Score
Jan 20–26, 2020	(United States) 2020 U.S. Championships	7	60.07	7	95.75	7	155.82

Results in the 2020–21 season
Date	Event	RD		FD		Total	
Date	Event	P	Score	P	Score	P	Score
Oct 23–24, 2020	(United States) 2020 Skate America	7	59.61	7	91.79	7	151.40
Jan 11–21, 2021	(United States) 2021 U.S. Championships	7	64.37	7	90.56	7	154.93

Results in the 2021–22 season
Date	Event	RD		FD		Total	
Date	Event	P	Score	P	Score	P	Score
Aug 12–15, 2021	(United States) 2021 Lake Placid Ice Dance International	3	65.24	5	94.63	5	159.87
Sep 14–17, 2021	(United States) 2021 U.S. International Classic	4	67.20	3	104.50	3	171.70
Nov 17–20, 2021	(Poland) 2021 CS Warsaw Cup	9	67.39	6	103.61	7	171.00
Jan 3–9, 2022	(United States) 2022 U.S. Championships	8	73.06	8	107.66	8	180.72

Results in the 2022–23 season
Date	Event	RD		FD		Total	
Date	Event	P	Score	P	Score	P	Score
Jul 26–29, 2022	(United States) 2022 Lake Placid Ice Dance International	2	71.60	2	107.86	2	179.46
Sep 12–16, 2022	(United States) 2022 CS U.S. International Classic	3	72.66	2	106.97	2	179.63
Sep 29 – Oct 1, 2022	(Slovakia) 2022 CS Nepela Memorial	2	72.31	2	106.38	2	178.69
Nov 4–6, 2022	2022 Grand Prix de France	5	69.46	6	104.57	5	174.03
Dec 7–10, 2022	(Croatia) 2022 CS Golden Spin of Zagreb	7	65.64	4	108.80	4	174.44
Jan 23–29, 2023	(United States) 2023 U.S. Championships	7	75.52	9	107.09	8	182.61

Results in the 2023–24 season
Date	Event	RD		FD		Total	
Date	Event	P	Score	P	Score	P	Score
Aug 1–2, 2023	(United States) 2023 Lake Placid Ice Dance International	3	72.78	3	105.17	3	177.95
Sep 14–16, 2023	(Canada) 2023 CS Autumn Classic International	1	77.02	2	114.18	1	191.20
Oct 27–29, 2023	2023 Skate Canada International	6	72.12	6	109.34	6	181.46
Nov 10–12, 2023	2023 Cup of China	4	73.29	4	111.29	4	184.58
Jan 22–28, 2024	(United States) 2024 U.S. Championships	7	73.81	5	110.94	5	184.75

Results in the 2024–25 season
Date	Event	RD		FD		Total	
Date	Event	P	Score	P	Score	P	Score
July 30–31, 2024	(United States) 2024 Lake Placid Ice Dance International	3	74.21	4	109.79	3	184.00
Oct 16–20, 2024	(France) 2024 CS Trophée Métropole Nice Côte d'Azur	3	72.82	4	108.01	3	180.83
Nov 1–3, 2024	2024 Grand Prix de France	8	71.47	9	97.29	9	168.76
Nov 15–17, 2024	(Finland) 2024 Finlandia Trophy	7	72.58	7	107.77	7	180.35
Nov 20–24, 2024	(Poland) 2024 CS Warsaw Cup	5	73.63	5	110.78	4	184.41
Jan 20–26, 2025	(United States) 2025 U.S. Championships	8	73.64	9	109.60	8	183.24

Results in the 2025–26 season
Date	Event	RD		FD		Total	
Date	Event	P	Score	P	Score	P	Score
July 29–31, 2025	(United States) 2025 Lake Placid Ice Dance International	4	71.23	4	107.69	4	178.92
Sep 11–14, 2025	(Italy) 2025 CS Lombardia Trophy	2	74.27	1	112.69	1	186.96
Oct 17–19, 2025	2025 Grand Prix de France	7	71.32	8	106.36	7	177.68
Nov 5–9, 2025	(Austria) 2025 Ice Challenge	1	70.91	1	105.94	1	176.85
Nov 25–30, 2025	(Estonia) 2025 CS Tallinn Trophy	3	74.03	5	108.78	4	182.81
Jan 4–11, 2026	(United States) 2026 U.S. Championships	8	73.54	14	96.95	11	170.49

Results in the 2026–27 season
Date	Event	RD		FD		Total	
Date	Event	P	Score	P	Score	P	Score
Jul 28–30, 2026	(United States) 2026 Lake Placid Ice Dance International	4	62.64	2	102.66	2	165.30
Sep 24–27, 2026	(Slovakia) 2026 CS Nepela Memorial	11	65.58	9	103.68	10	169.26
Oct 23–25, 2026	2026 Grand Prix de France	4	64.80	8	91.27	6	156.07
Nov 6–8, 2026	2026 Cup of China	7	64.84	7	96.20	7	161.04
