= Pasquale Camerlengo =

Italian ice dancer (born 1966)

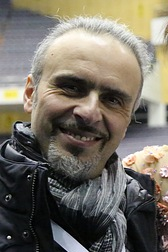

Personal information
- Born: 14 April 1966 (age 60) Milan, Italy

Figure skating career
- Country: Italy
- Retired: 1998

Pasquale Camerlengo (born 14 April 1966) is an Italian former competitive ice dancer who is now a coach and choreographer. With Stefania Calegari, he won gold medals at Skate America, Skate Canada, and the International de Paris, and placed fifth at the 1992 Winter Olympics. Camerlengo later competed with Diane Gerencser, placing 17th at the 1998 Winter Olympics.

== Career ==
=== Competitive career ===
Camerlengo competed with Stefania Calegari for around ten years. They won gold medals at the 1990 Skate America, 1990 Grand Prix International de Paris, and 1991 Skate Canada International, a silver medal at the 1992 Nations Cup, and bronze medals at the 1990 and 1991 NHK Trophy. In 1992, they achieved their highest results at the European Championships and World Championships, placing fourth at both events. They also competed at the 1992 Winter Olympics and finished fifth. They retired from competition in 1993.

In 1996, Camerlengo returned to competition with new partner Diane Gerencser. They were coached by Muriel Boucher-Zazoui in Villard-de-Lans and Lyon. The duo placed 11th at the 1997 European Championships and 17th at the 1998 Winter Olympics in Nagano, Japan. They retired from competition after the 1998 World Championships.

=== Coaching and choreography ===
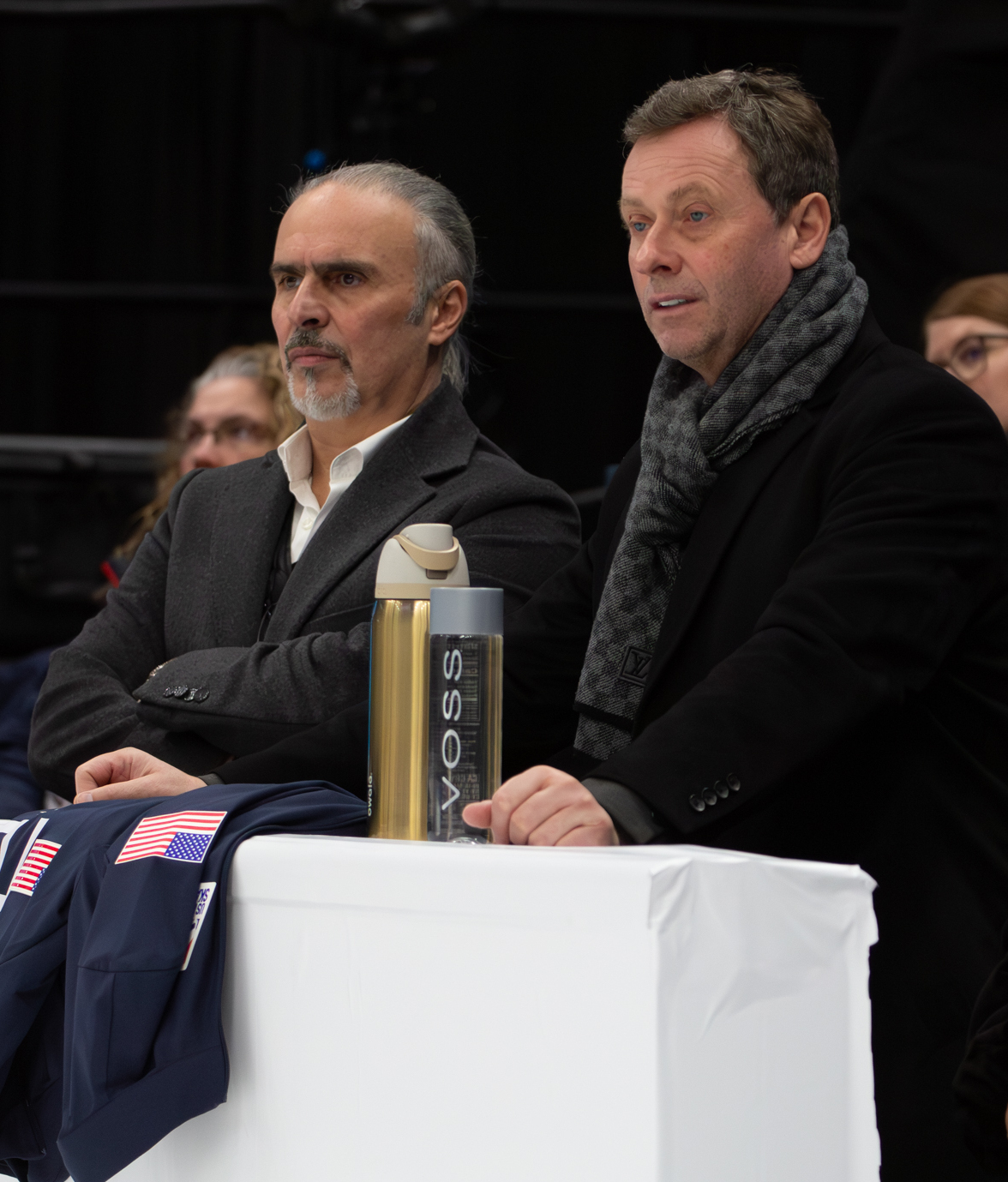
Camerlengo (left) with Igor Shpilband (right) at the 2026 U.S. Championships

Camerlengo began choreographing in the early 1990s, doing parts of his own programs. After his first retirement from competition in 1993, Carlo Fassi hired him to do choreography for his students; Camerlengo worked in Milan for two years.

After his final retirement, Boucher-Zazoui invited Camerlengo to work alongside her in Lyon. He also coached for a year in Berlin, Germany, and then moved to Delaware. In September 2006, he began coaching at the Detroit Skating Club in Bloomfield Hills, Michigan, in collaboration with wife and former World champion ice dancer, Anjelika Krylova. Additionally, he also collaborated with Massimo Scali, Natalia Annenko-Deller, and Elizabeth Punsalan.

In 2018, he relocated to Novi, Michigan to work at the Novi Ice Arena, alongside Igor Shpilband.

His current and former students have included:

- (Belgium) Sofiia Beznosikova / Max Leleu
- (United States) Christina Carreira / Anthony Ponomorenko
- (Russia) Diana Davis / Gleb Smolkin
- (Italy) Federica Faiella / Massimo Scali
- (United States) Kaitlin Hawayek / Jean-Luc Baker
- (United States) Madison Hubbell / Zachary Donohue
- (United States) Madison Hubbell / Keiffer Hubbell
- (Finland) Daniela Ivanitskiy / Matthew Sperry
- (South Korea) Rebeka Kim / Kirill Minov
- (South Korea) Yura Min / Daniel Eaton
- (United States) Avonley Nguyen / Vadym Kolesnik
- (Australia) Danielle O'Brien / Gregory Merriman
- (United States) Eva Pate / Logan Bye
- (Canada) Alexandra Paul / Mitchell Islam
- (France) Nathalie Pechalat / Fabian Bourzat
- (United States) Jasmine Robertson / Chase Rohner
- (United Kingdom) Robynne Tweedale / Joseph Buckland
- (Canada) Kaitlyn Weaver / Andrew Poje
- (United States) Jennifer Wester / Daniil Barantsev
- (United States) Katarina Wolfkostin / Jeffrey Chen
- (United States) Emilea Zingas / Vadym Kolesnik

He has choreographed programs for many skaters, including:

- (United States) Jeremy Abbott
- (United States) Alexandra Aldridge / Daniel Eaton
- (Japan) Rie Arikawa / Kenji Miyamoto
- (Germany) Lutricia Bock
- (Czech Republic) Michal Březina
- (United States) Karen Chen
- (Romania) Gheorghe Chiper
- (South Korea) Choi Da-bin
- (United States) Alissa Czisny
- (Netherlands) Daria Danilova / Michel Tsiba
- (France) Isabel Delobel / Olivier Schoenfelder
- (Canada) Jessica Dubé / Bryce Davison
- (Canada) Marie-France Dubreuil / Patrice Lauzon
- (Philippines) Isabella Gamez / Aleksandr Korovin
- (Germany) Jennifer Janse van Rensburg / Benjamin Steffan
- (France) Stanick Jeannette
- (Romania) Roxana Luca
- (Japan) Kanako Murakami
- (Japan) Yasuharu Nanri
- (Canada) Kaetlyn Osmond
- (Russia) Evgeni Plushenko
- (Russia) Anna Pogorilaya
- (United States) Adam Rippon
- (United States) Tommy Steenberg
- (United States) Audrey Shin
- (Japan) Akiko Suzuki
- (Japan) Daisuke Takahashi
- (Czech Republic) Natálie Taschlerová / Filip Taschler
- (Czech Republic) Tomáš Verner

== Personal life ==
Camerlengo and Anjelika Krylova were married with two children, Stella Camerlengo (born on July 24, 2005) and Anthony Camerlengo (born on September 10, 2007). Stella and Anthony lived in Moscow with Anjelika. In 2021, Stella and Anthony moved to Metro Detroit and have been living with Camerlengo.

== Results ==
=== With Calegari ===
International
Event	1983–84	1984–85	1985–86	1986–87	1987–88	1988–89	1989–90	1990–91	1991–92	1992–93
Olympics									5th	
Worlds			15th			7th	10th	6th	4th	6th
Europeans			12th	13th	11th	5th		6th	4th	5th
Skate America				6th				1st		
Skate Canada						4th			1st	
Int. de Paris								1st		
NHK Trophy	7th							3rd	3rd	
Nations Cup										2nd
Nebelhorn					2nd					
Golden Spin					2nd					
National
Italian Champ.						1st		1st	1st	1st

=== With Gerencser ===
International
Event	1996–97	1997–98
Winter Olympics		17th
World Championships		16th
European Championships	11th	13th
Lysiane Lauret	1st	
Autumn Trophy	2nd	
