= Lake Placid Ice Dance International =

International figure skating competition

- Status: Active
- Genre: International competition
- Frequency: Annual
- Venue: Olympic Center
- Location: Lake Placid, New York
- Country: United States
- Organizer: U.S. Figure Skating

The Lake Placid Ice Dance International is an annual international ice dance competition held in Lake Placid, New York. It was first held in 1932. In 2015 and 2016, the senior event was included on the International Skating Union's calendar. The event takes place early in the season, usually in late July. Medals are awarded at the senior and junior levels.

The 2021 edition of the event was held in Norwood, Massachusetts, due to construction at the traditional Lake Placid site.

== Senior medalists ==
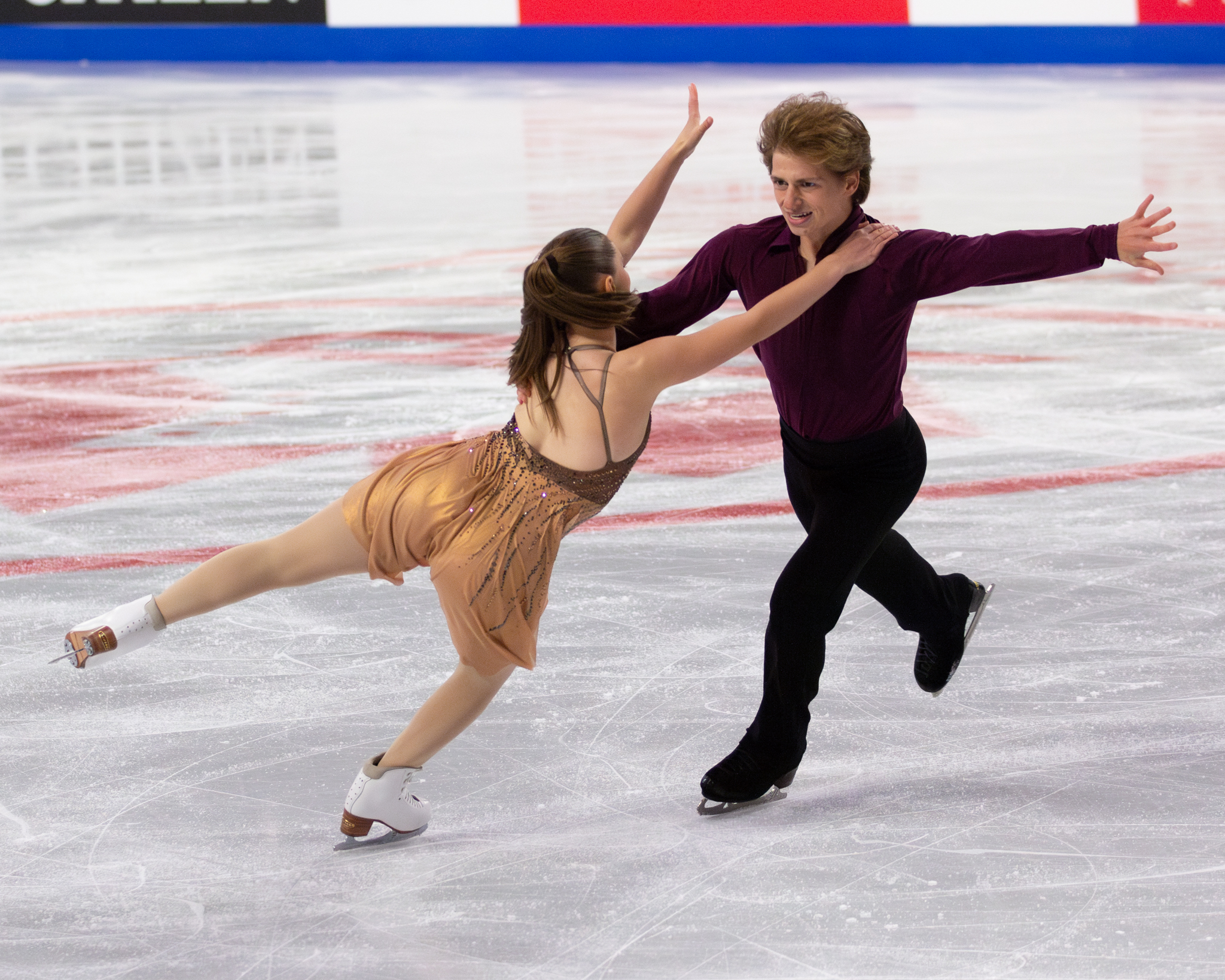
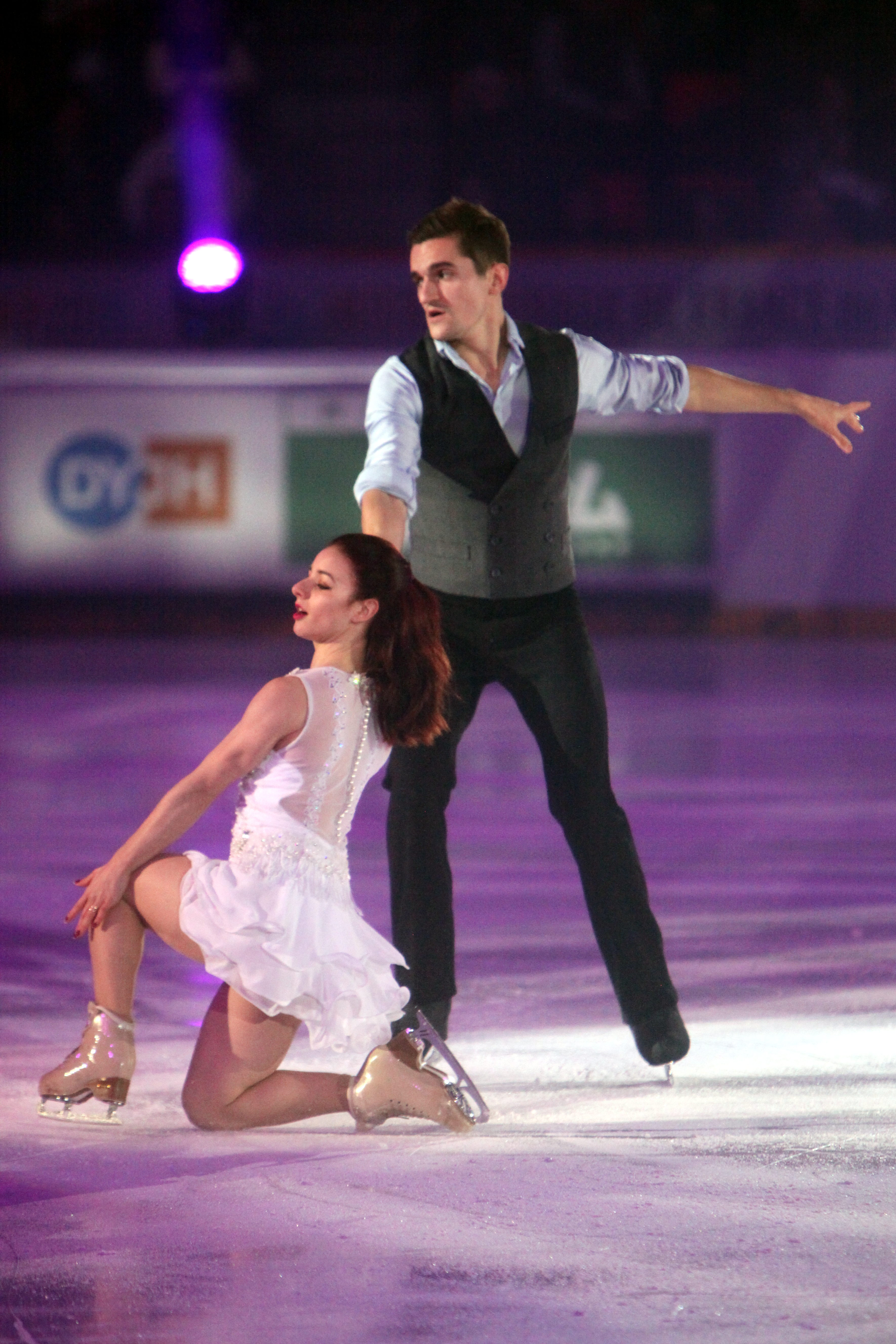
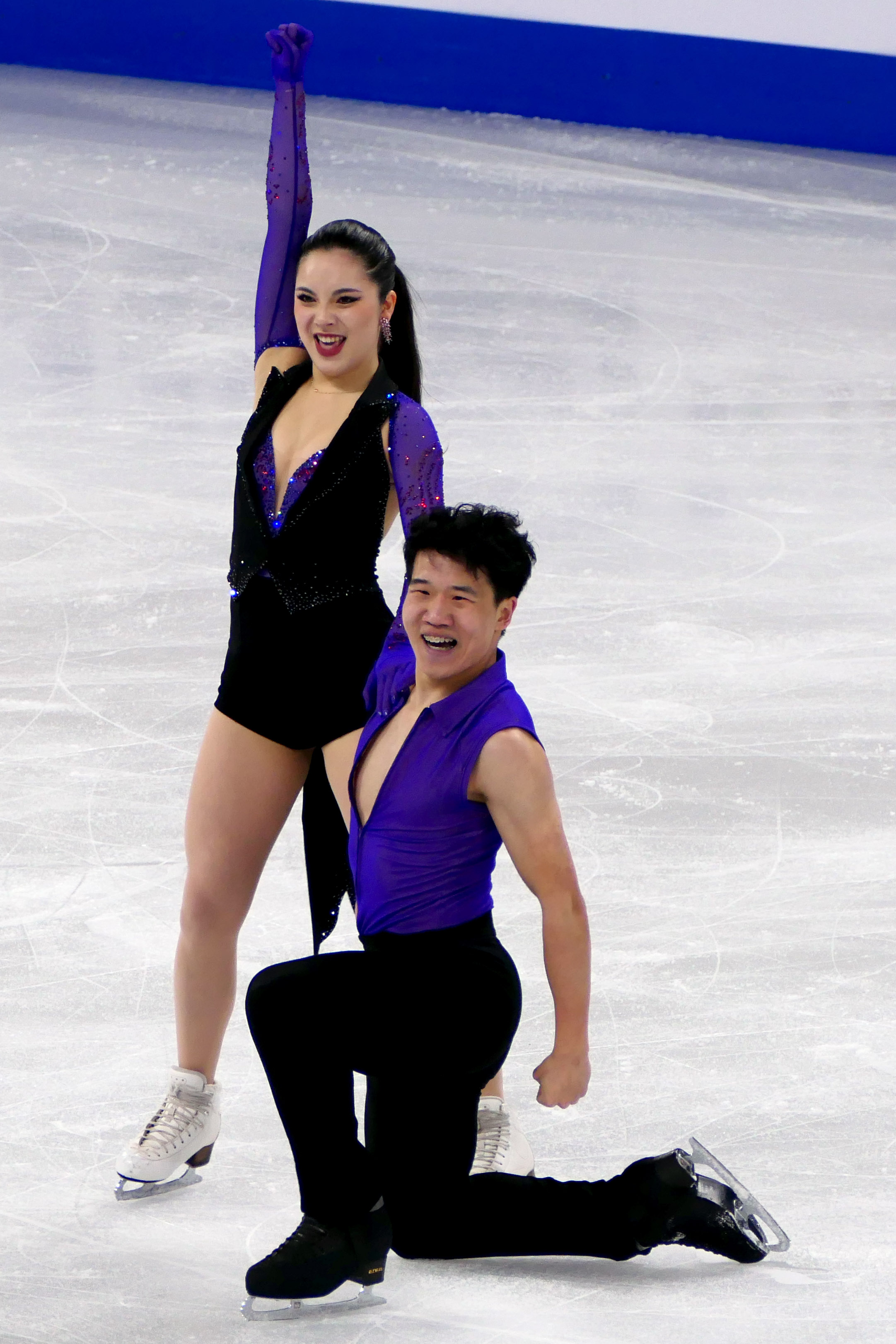
The 2025 Lake Placid Ice Dance International medalists: Oona Brown and Gage Brown of the United States (gold); Marie-Jade Lauriault and Romain Le Gac of Canada (silver); and Hannah Lim and Ye Quan of South Korea (bronze)

Senior medalists
Year	Gold	Silver	Bronze	Ref.
2015	(Israel); Isabella Tobias; Ilia Tkachenko	(United States); Danielle Thomas; Daniel Eaton	(Canada); Carolane Soucisse; Simon Tanguay	
2016	(United States); Elliana Pogrebinsky; Alex Benoit	(Spain); Olivia Smart; Adrià Díaz	(South Korea); Yura Min; Alexander Gamelin	
2017	(United States); Lorraine McNamara; Quinn Carpenter	(United States); Rachel Parsons; Michael Parsons	(United States); Elliana Pogrebinsky; Alex Benoit	
2018	(United States); Lorraine McNamara; Quinn Carpenter	(United States); Rachel Parsons; Michael Parsons	(Canada); Haley Sales; Nikolas Wamsteeker	
2019	(Spain); Olivia Smart; Adrià Díaz	(United States); Christina Carreira; Anthony Ponomarenko	(United States); Lorraine McNamara; Quinn Carpenter	
2020	Competition cancelled			
2021	(United States); Caroline Green; Michael Parsons	(Armenia); Tina Garabedian; Simon Proulx-Sénécal	(United States); Molly Cesanek; Yehor Yehorov	
2022	(United States); Lorraine McNamara; Anton Spiridonov	(United States); Eva Pate; Logan Bye	(United States); Katarina Wolfkostin; Jeffrey Chen	
2023	(Georgia (country)); Diana Davis; Gleb Smolkin	(United States); Oona Brown; Gage Brown	(United States); Eva Pate; Logan Bye	
2024	(Canada); Marie-Jade Lauriault; Romain Le Gac	(United States); Oona Brown; Gage Brown	(United States); Eva Pate; Logan Bye	
2025	(United States); Oona Brown; Gage Brown	(Canada); Marie-Jade Lauriault; Romain Le Gac	(South Korea); Hannah Lim; Ye Quan	
2026	(United States); Amy Cui; Jonathan Rogers	(United States); Eva Pate; Logan Bye	(United States); Leah Neset; Artem Markelov	

== Junior medalists ==
Junior medalists
Year	Gold	Silver	Bronze	Ref.
2015	(United States); Rachel Parsons; Michael Parsons	(United States); Christina Carreira; Anthony Ponomarenko	(Russia); Ksenia Konkina; Georgy Reviya	
2016	(United States); Rachel Parsons; Michael Parsons	(United States); Chloe Lewis; Logan Bye	(United States); Eliana Gropman; Ian Somerville	
2017	(United States); Christina Carreira; Anthony Ponomarenko	(United States); Caroline Green; Gordon Green	(United States); Emma Gunter; Caleb Wein	
2018	(United States); Emma Gunter; Caleb Wein	(Canada); Miku Makita; Tyler Gunara	(Canada); Irina Galiyanova; Grayson Lochhead	
2019	(Canada); Nadiia Bashynska; Peter Beaumont	(Canada); Emmy Bronsard; Aissa Bouaraguia	(United States); Molly Cesanek; Yehor Yehorov	
2020	Competition cancelled			
2021	(United States); Isabella Flores; Dimitry Tsarevski	(United States); Angela Ling; Caleb Wein	(United States); Leah Neset; Artem Markelov	
2022	(Israel); Elizabeth Tkachenko; Alexei Kiliakov	(United States); Vanessa Pham; Jonathan Rogers	(United States); Helena Carhart; Volodymyr Horovyi	
2023	(United States); Leah Neset; Artem Markelov	(United States); Elliana Peal; Ethan Peal	(United States); Caroline Mullen; Brendan Mullen	
2024	(United States); Hana Maria Aboian; Daniil Veselukhin	(United States); Katarina Wolfkostin; Dimitry Tsarevski	(United States); Caroline Mullen; Brendan Mullen	
2025	(United States); Hana Maria Aboian; Daniil Veselukhin	(United States); Annelise Stapert; Maxim Korotcov	(Germany); Alexia Kruk; Jan Eisenhaber	
2026	(United States); Hana Maria Aboian; Daniil Veselukhin	(United States); Aneta Vaclavikova; William Lissauer	(United States); Jane Calhoun; Mark Zheltyshev	
