= Logan Bye =

American ice dancer (born 1998)

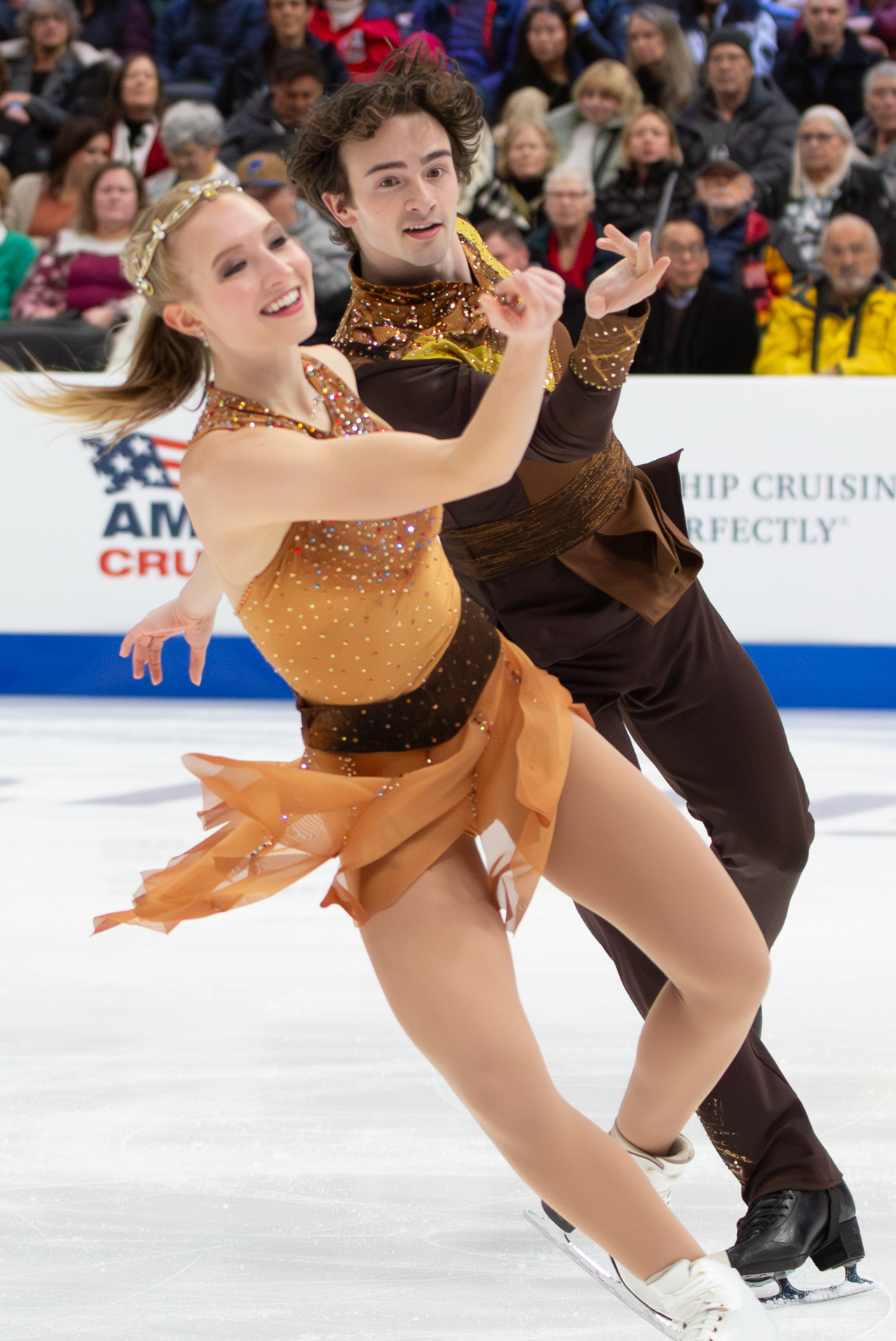
- Bye with Eva Pate at the 2026 U.S. Championships

Personal information
- Born: March 2, 1998 (age 28) Colorado Springs, Colorado, U.S.
- Height: 5 ft 8 in (1.73 m)

Figure skating career
- Country: United States
- Discipline: Ice dance
- Partner: Eva Pate (since 2019); Chloe Lewis (2010–18)
- Coach: Pasquale Camerlengo; Igor Shpilband; Natalia Deller; Adrienne Lenda
- Skating club: Skating Club of New York
- Began skating: 2001

Medal record
Winter Youth Olympics
Silver medal – second place	2016 Lillehammer	Ice dance

Logan Bye (born March 2, 1998) is an American ice dancer. With his skating partner and wife, Eva Pate, he is a six-time Challenger Series medalist.

With former partner Chloe Lewis, he is the 2016 Youth Olympic silver medalist, 2016 JGP Estonia bronze medalist, and 2018 U.S. Junior bronze medalist.

== Personal life ==
Logan Bye was born on March 2, 1998, in Colorado Springs, Colorado. He moved to Portland, Oregon, in 2012, and then, two years later, to Michigan. He has a younger sister named Jessica. In May 2021, he graduated from the University of Michigan in Ann Arbor, earning a master's degree in biomedical engineering.

Bye began dating Eva Pate in December 2018 before they became on-ice partners. They became engaged in August 2022. They married in May 2024.

== Career ==
Bye began learning to skate in 2001.

=== Partnership with Chloe Lewis ===
==== Early years ====
Logan Bye and Chloe Lewis met in February 2010 at a rink in Sun Valley, Idaho, and began training together in August 2010. Because they lived in different cities, they trained half a month together and half apart during their first two seasons. During the 2010–11 season, they qualified to compete at the intermediate level at the U.S. Junior Championships, where they finished sixth.

Lewis and Bye placed fourth on the novice level at the 2012 U.S. Championships. They began training together regularly after Bye moved to Beaverton, Oregon, in the autumn of 2012. They won the novice title at the 2013 U.S. Championships.

During the 2013–14 season, Lewis and Bye were coached by Ikaika Young in Portland, Oregon; by Judy Blumberg in Sun Valley, Idaho; and by Igor Shpilband in Novi, Michigan. They were invited to make their international junior debut, appearing twice on the Junior Grand Prix circuit. They finished fifth at the 2013 JGP Mexico in Mexico City, and eleventh at the 2013 JGP Czech Republic in Ostrava. Lewis and Bye ended the season at the 2014 U.S. Junior Championships, where they finished in sixth place.

In 2014–15, Lewis and Bye were coached by Shpilband and Blumberg in Novi, Michigan. Only given one Junior Grand Prix assignment for that season, they finished fifth at the 2014 JGP France in Courchevel, and then finished seventh at the 2015 U.S. Junior Championships.

==== 2015–16 season: Youth Olympics silver ====
Lewis and Bye were coached solely by Shpilband going into their third international junior season. Again given two Junior Grand Prix assignments, Lewis and Bye placed fifth at both the 2015 JGP Spain and the 2015 JGP United States.

In January 2016, Lewis and Bye finished sixth at the 2016 U.S. Junior Championships. As a result of this placement, they were selected for Team USA as the lone American entry at the 2016 Winter Youth Olympics in Hamar, Norway. Ranked third in the short dance and second in the free dance, they were awarded the silver medal. Bye said afterward that "being here is an honor and getting a medal it definitely inspires us quite a bit, knowing that all of our work for the season has paid off, and we’re just going to keep on working."

==== 2016–17 season: First Junior Grand Prix medal ====
Beginning the season on the Junior Grand Prix circuit, Lewis and Bye finished sixth at the 2016 JGP Czech Republic. They then competed at the 2016 JGP Estonia, where, despite difficulties again in the short dance, they won the bronze medal.

At the 2017 U.S. Junior Championships, Lewis and Bye placed fourth and received the pewter medals.

==== 2017–18 season ====
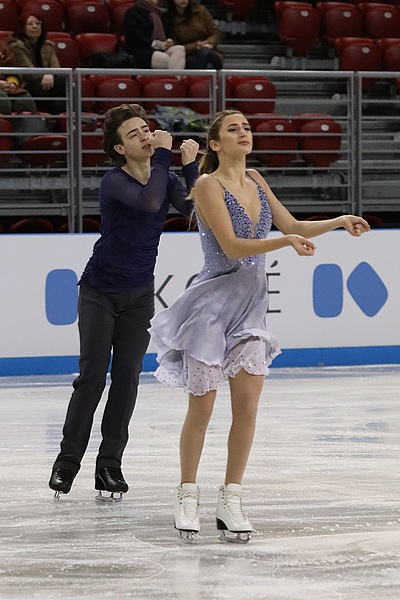
Lewis and Bye at the 2018 World Junior Championships

In their final season on the Junior Grand Prix circuit, Lewis and Bye finished fifth at both the 2017 JGP Australia and the 2017 JGP Italy.

Lewis and Bye won the bronze medal at the 2018 U.S. Junior Championships. By virtue of their top three finish, they were assigned to the American team for the 2018 World Junior Championships in Sofia, Bulgaria, where they finished in seventh place.

While the team had initially intended to continue and had planned programs for the following season, Lewis had begun to feel "very burnt out" with training and ultimately chose to retire from competitive skating.

=== Partnership with Eva Pate ===
==== 2019–20 season ====
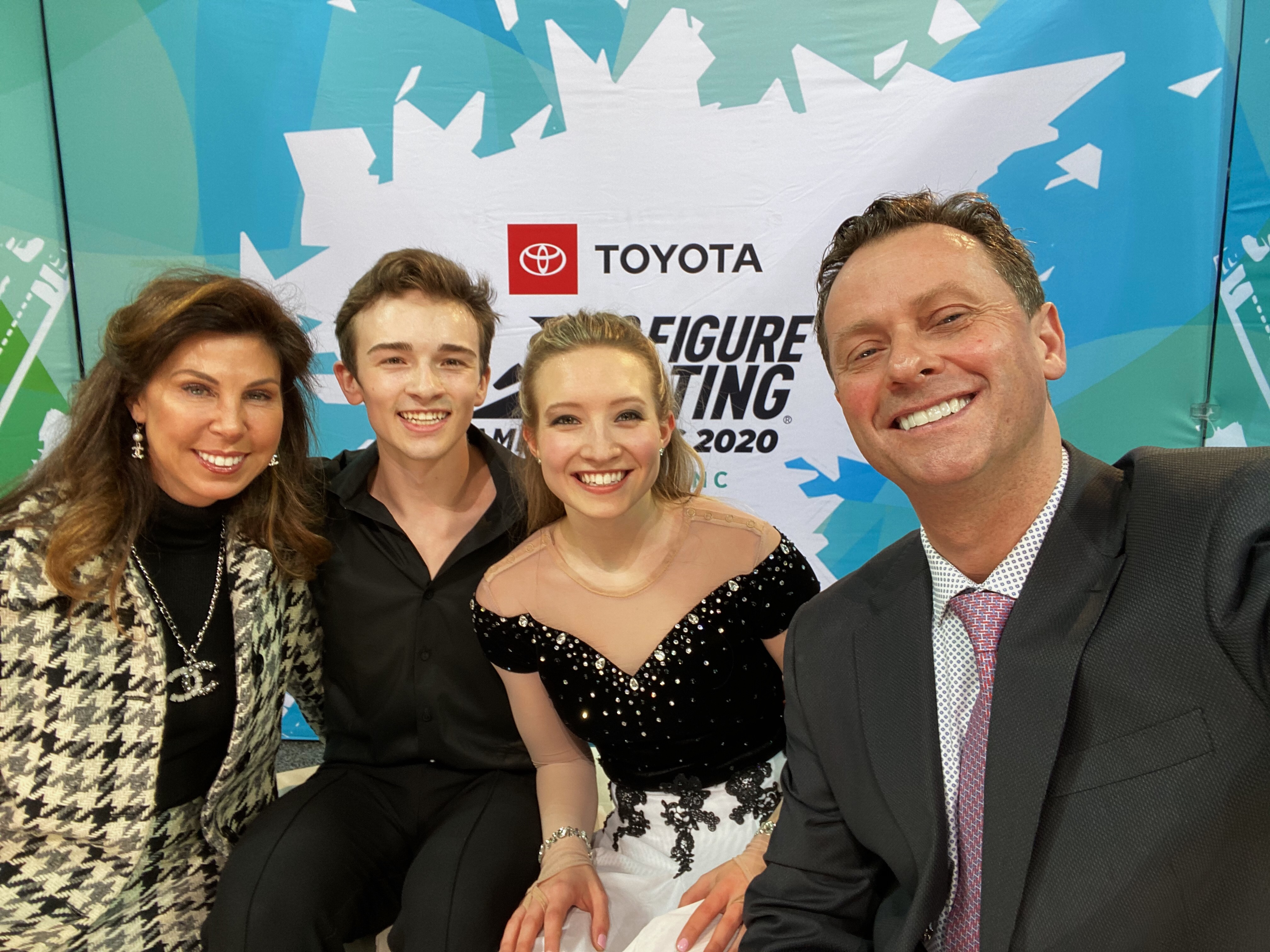
Adrienne Lenda (left), Logan Bye, Eva Pate, and Igor Sphilband (right) at the 2020 U.S. Championships

Bye had begun dating solo ice dancer Eva Pate in December 2018, and in June 2019, they decided to become an on-ice partnership, coached by Shpilband, Pasquale Camerlengo, Adrienne Lenda, and Natalia Deller in Novi, Michigan.

Pate/Bye made their domestic debut at the Midwestern Sectional Dance Challenge, where they won the silver medal. They went on to win the U.S. Ice Dance Final in Hyannis, Massachusetts. This, in turn, qualified them for their debut at the 2020 U.S. Championships, where they finished in seventh place.

==== 2020–21 season ====
Due to the onset of the COVID-19 pandemic, competition opportunities were limited both domestically and internationally for the 2020–21 season. Pate/Bye were assigned to make their Grand Prix debut at the 2020 Skate America in Las Vegas, attended primarily by American skaters due to travel restrictions pandemic. They finished in seventh place.

At the U.S. Championships later that season, they finished in seventh place as well.

==== 2021–22 season ====
With the resumption of a more normal international calendar, Pate/Bye made their season debut at the Lake Placid Ice Dance International, where they finished in fifth place. They were assigned the U.S. Classic where they earned their first international bronze medal. Pate said of the occasion that "we have been training really hard every day and just being able to be out here and put out a clean skate makes me feel really proud of us." Making their debut in the Challenger series, they finished in seventh place at the 2021 Warsaw Cup.

At the U.S. Championships, Pate/Bye finished in eighth place.

==== 2022–23 season ====
Pate/Bye began their season at the Lake Placid Ice Dance International, where they won the silver medal. They were given two Challenger circuit assignments after that, first winning the silver medal at the 2022 U.S International Classic, held in Lake Placid. They set new personal bests in the process, with Bye adding that "we wanted to put out what we've been training, so I thought it went well." They went on to win a second silver medal at the 2022 Nepela Memorial. The team received their second ever Grand Prix assignment at the 2022 Grand Prix de France. Pate described her reaction to the news: "My mom called me, and she was like, ‘You're going to France!’ and I'm like, ‘that’s crazy!’ I was so excited." They finished fifth at the event. Pate/Bye were selected to compete in a third Challenger circuit assignment, the 2022 Golden Spin of Zagreb, where they earned a season's best free dance score and finished in fourth place.

Concluding the season at the 2023 U.S. Championships, Pate/Bye finished eighth for the second consecutive year.

==== 2023–24 season ====
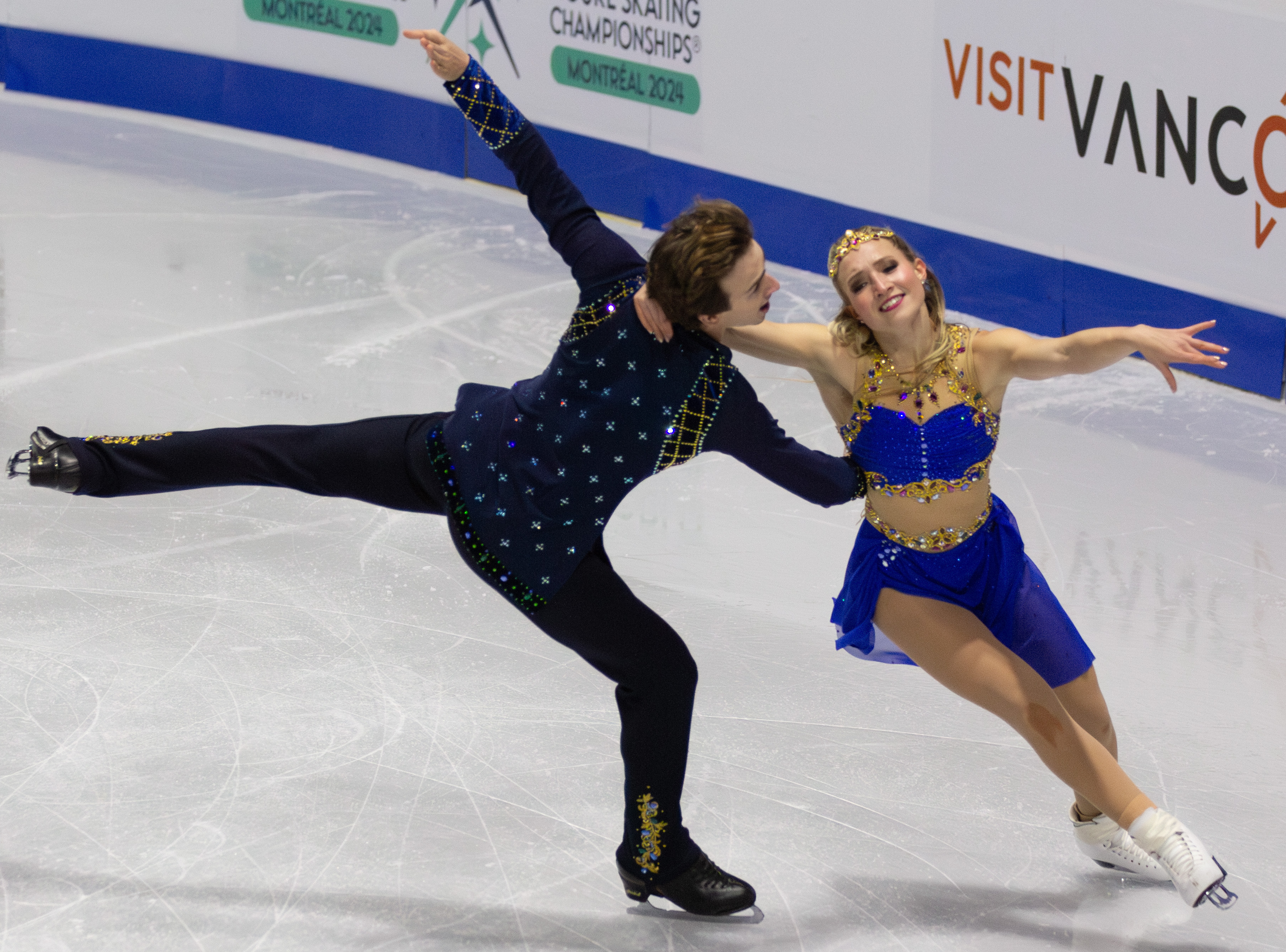
Pate and Bye at 2023 Skate Canada International

Pate/Bye won the bronze medal at the Lake Placid Ice Dance International in August, before competing at the 2023 Autumn Classic International. They set new personal bests at the competition and won the gold medal. This was the team's first international gold medal. Given two assignments on the Grand Prix assignments, they finished sixth at the 2023 Skate Canada International and fourth at the 2023 Cup of China.

At the 2024 U.S. Figure Skating Championships, Pate/Bye finished in fifth place. "We just need to get stronger because I feel like our technical ability is there," said Pate after the free dance. "It’s just the little in between things that could get better and help us more in the future.”

==== 2024–25 season ====
Pate/Bye began the season by winning bronze at the 2024 Lake Placid Ice Dance International and at the 2024 CS Trophée Métropole Nice Côte d'Azur. Going on to compete on the 2024–25 Grand Prix circuit, the team finished ninth at the 2024 Grand Prix de France and seventh at the 2024 Finlandia Trophy.

Concluding the season at the 2025 U.S. Championships, Pate/Bye finished in eighth place.

==== 2025–26 season ====
Pate/Bye started the season by placing fourth at the 2025 Lake Placid Ice Dance International. They then went on to win gold at the 2025 CS Lombardia Trophy. Selected to compete on the 2025–26 Grand Prix circuit, finishing seventh at the 2025 Grand Prix de France.

In November, Pate/Bye won the gold medal at the 2025 Ice Challenge and finished fourth at the 2025 CS Tallinn Trophy. Two months later, they competed at the 2026 U.S. Championships, finishing in eleventh place.

== Programs ==
=== Ice dance with Eva Pate ===
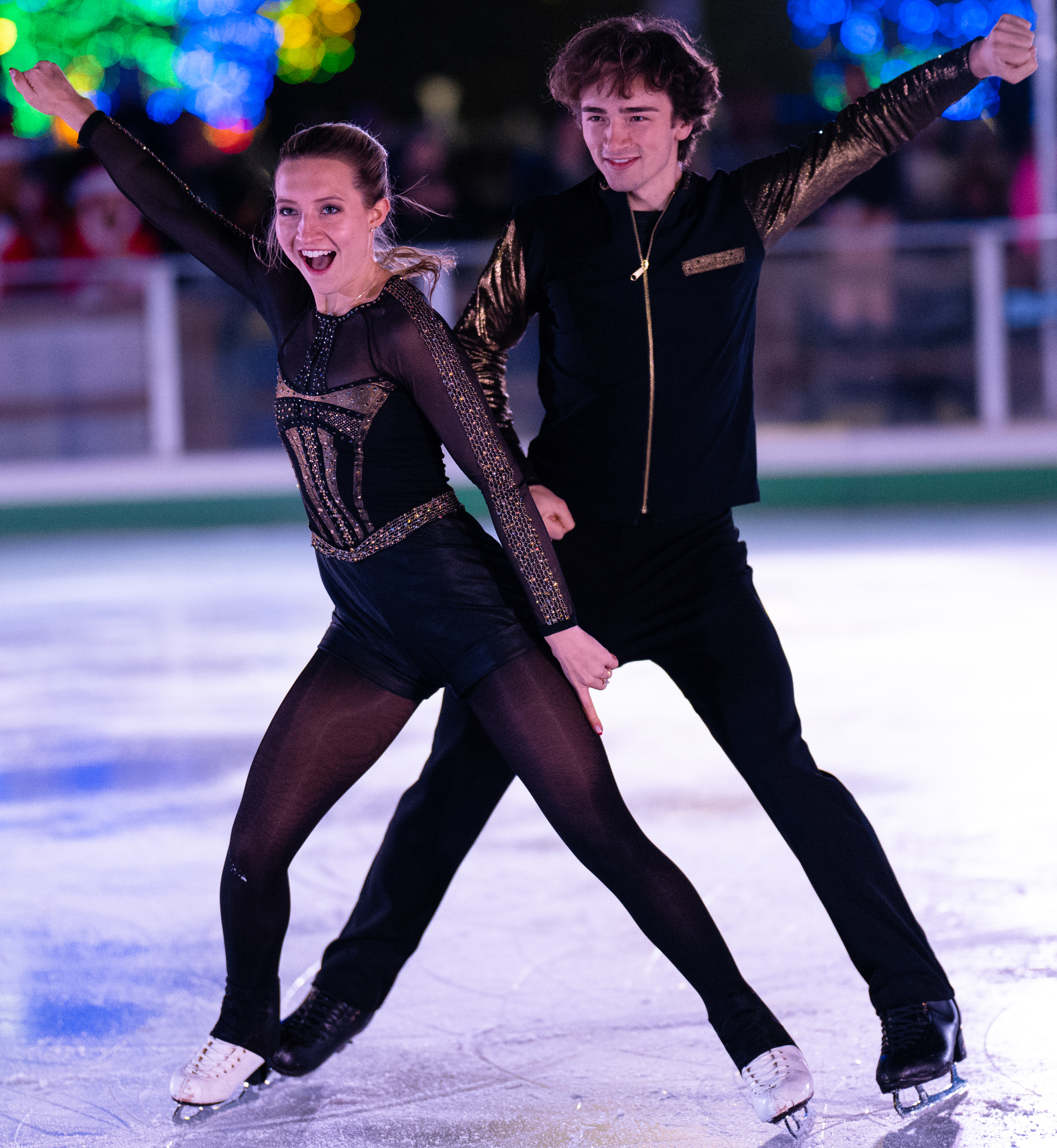
Pate and Bye at Cleveland Public Square in 2023

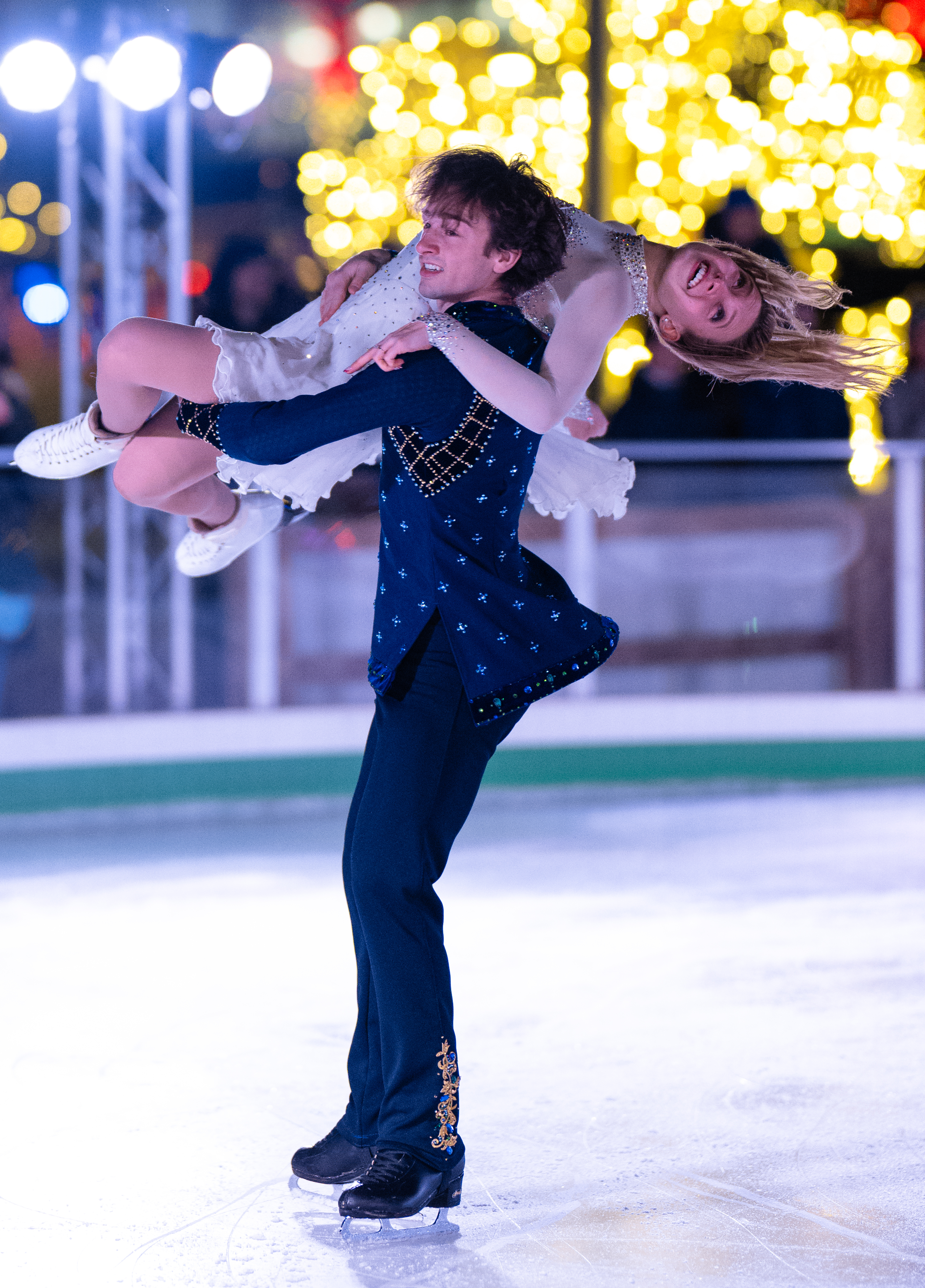
Pate and Bye performing a lift at Cleveland Public Square in 2023

Season	Rhythm dance	Free dance	Exhibition
2019–2020	Anything Goes performed by New Broadway Orchestra; It's De-Lovely (from Anything Goes) performed by Sarah Vaughan choreo. by Igor Shpilband, Pasquale Camerlengo	Say Something by A Great Big World and Christina Aguilera; Primavera by Ludovico Einaudi choreo. by Igor Shpilband, Pasquale Camerlengo	
2020–2021	Motown: The Musical; My Girl; I Want You Back – ABC – The Love You Save; Stop! In the Name of Love by Motown: The Musical Original Broadway Cast choreo. by Igor Shpilband, Pasquale Camerlengo	Say Something by A Great Big World and Christina Aguilera; Primavera by Ludovico Einaudi choreo. by Igor Shpilband, Pasquale Camerlengo	
2021–2022	Cry Me a River by Justin Timberlake; Bye Bye Bye by NSYNC choreo. by Igor Shpilband, Pasquale Camerlengo, Charlie White, Renee Petkovski	The Hunger Games: The Hanging Tree by James Newton Howard, feat. Jennifer Lawrence; Abraham's Daughter by Arcade Fire; Everybody Wants to Rule the World performed by Lorde choreo. by Igor Shpilband, Pasquale Camerlengo, Charlie White, Renee Petkovski	
2022–2023	Samba: Beautiful Creatures (from Rio 2) by Barbatuques, Andy García, and Rita Moreno; Rhumba: Fly Love by Jamie Foxx; Samba: Real in Rio (from Rio) performed by Rio Singers choreo. by Igor Shpilband, Pasquale Camerlengo, Renee Petkovski, Oksana Zolotarevskaya, Zachary Donohue	Reel Around the Sun (from Riverdance) by Bill Whelan choreo. by Igor Shpilband, Pasquale Camerlengo, Renee Petkovski, Oksana Zolotarevskaya, Zachary Donohue	Oops!... I Did It Again by Britney Spears; Pop; Bye Bye Bye by NSYNC choreo. by Igor Shpilband, Pasquale Camerlengo, Charlie White, Renee Petkovski
2023–2024	My Prerogative by Bobby Brown; Walk This Way by Run-DMC & Aerosmith choreo. by Igor Shpilband, Pasquale Camerlengo, Renee Petkovski, Randi Strong	Polovtsian Dances (from Prince Igor) by Alexander Borodin choreo. by Igor Shpilband, Pasquale Camerlengo, Renee Petkovski, Randi Strong	The Hunger Games; The Hanging Tree by James Newton Howard, feat. Jennifer Lawrence; Everybody Wants to Rule the World performed by Lorde choreo. by Igor Shpilband, Pasquale Camerlengo, Charlie White, Renee Petkovski
2024–2025	Le Freak by Chic; Car Wash by Rose Royce; Shake Your Groove Thing by Peaches & Herb choreo. by Igor Shpilband, Pasquale Camerlengo, Renee Petkovski	Hungarian Rhapsody No. 2 in C-Sharp Minor by Franz Liszt performed by Erich Kunzel & Cincinnati Pops Orchestra choreo. by Igor Shpilband, Pasquale Camerlengo, Renee Petkovski	
2025–2026	Enter Sandman by Metallica; Thunderstruck by AC/DC choreo. by Angelika Krylova, Pasquale Camerlengo, Igor Shpilband, Renee Petkovski	The Lion King by Hans Zimmer; Rafiki’s Fireflies; Stampede; Remember; King of Pride Rock / Circle of Life performed by Lebo M choreo. by Angelika Krylova, Pasquale Camerlengo, Igor Shpilband, Renee Petkovski	

=== Ice dance with Chloe Lewis ===
Season	Short dance	Free dance
2013–2014	Quickstep: Call Me Irresponsible by Bobby Darin; Foxtrot: Oh Marie by Michael Bublé; Waltz	Theme from Schindler's List by John Williams; Hava Nagila by Abraham Zevi Idelsohn; Dance for Me, Wallis (from W.E.) by Abel Korzeniowski
2014–2015	Samba: Chiqui Chiqui Boom by David Civera; Mambo: Mambo Jambo (Qué rico el mambo); Mambo: It's Mambo Time	Preludes by Frédéric Chopin: Prelude in C minor; Prelude in F minor; Prelude in E minor
2015–2016	Waltz: Valse triste by Jean Sibelius	Tristeza Separacion; Milonga Loca by Astor Piazzolla; Soledad; Concerto para quinteto by Gidon Kremer
2016–2017	Blues: Save My Soul; Swing: Jumpin' Jack by Big Bad Voodoo Daddy	Rhapsody in Blue by George Gershwin; Embraceable You; I've Got Rhythm performed by Judy Garland
2017–2018	Carino; Como Ama Una Mujer by Jennifer Lopez; On the Floor by Jennifer Lopez ft. Pitbull	Final Breath; Place de République; Metal Gleamed in Twilight by Cœur de Pirate

== Competitive highlights ==
- GP – Event of the ISU Grand Prix Series
- JGP – Event of the ISU Junior Grand Prix Series
- CS – Event of the ISU Challenger Series
- TBD – Assigned
- WD – Withdrew from competition

=== Ice dance with Eva Pate ===
Competition placements at senior level
Season	2019–20	2020–21	2021–22	2022–23	2023–24	2024–25	2025–26	2026–27
U.S. Championships	7th	7th	8th	8th	5th	8th	11th	
GP Cup of China					4th			7th
GP Finland						7th		
GP France				5th		9th	7th	6th
GP Skate America		7th						
GP Skate Canada					6th			
CS Autumn Classic					1st			
CS Golden Spin of Zagreb				4th				
CS Lombardia Trophy							1st	
CS Nepela Memorial				2nd				10th
CS Tallinn Trophy							4th	
CS Trophée Métropole Nice						3rd		
CS U.S. Classic			3rd	2nd				
CS Warsaw Cup			7th			4th		
Ice Challenge							1st	
Lake Placid Ice Dance International			5th	2nd	3rd	3rd	4th	2nd

=== Ice dance with Chloe Lewis ===
Competition placements at junior level
Season	2013–14	2014–15	2015–16	2016–17	2017–18
Winter Youth Olympics			2nd		
World Junior Championships					7th
U.S. Championships	6th	7th	6th	4th	3rd
JGP Australia					5th
JGP Czech Republic	11th			6th	
JGP Estonia				3rd	
JGP France		5th			
JGP Italy					5th
JGP Mexico	5th				
JGP Spain			5th		
JGP United States			5th		
Lake Placid Ice Dance				2nd	

== Detailed results ==
=== Ice dance with Eva Pate ===
ISU personal best scores in the +5/-5 GOE System
Segment	Type	Score	Event
Total	TSS	191.20	2023 CS Autumn Classic International
Rhythm dance	TSS	77.02	2023 CS Autumn Classic International
Rhythm dance	TES	44.69	2023 CS Autumn Classic International
Rhythm dance	PCS	32.33	2023 CS Autumn Classic International
Free dance	TSS	114.18	2023 CS Autumn Classic International
Free dance	TES	64.28	2023 CS Autumn Classic International
Free dance	PCS	49.90	2023 CS Autumn Classic International

==== Senior level ====
Results in the 2019–20 season
Date	Event	RD		FD		Total	
Date	Event	P	Score	P	Score	P	Score
Jan 20–26, 2020	(United States) 2020 U.S. Championships	7	60.07	7	95.75	7	155.82

Results in the 2020–21 season
Date	Event	RD		FD		Total	
Date	Event	P	Score	P	Score	P	Score
Oct 23–24, 2020	(United States) 2020 Skate America	7	59.61	7	91.79	7	151.40
Jan 11–21, 2021	(United States) 2021 U.S. Championships	7	64.37	7	90.56	7	154.93

Results in the 2021–22 season
Date	Event	RD		FD		Total	
Date	Event	P	Score	P	Score	P	Score
Aug 12–15, 2021	(United States) 2021 Lake Placid Ice Dance International	3	65.24	5	94.63	5	159.87
Sep 14–17, 2021	(United States) 2021 U.S. International Classic	4	67.20	3	104.50	3	171.70
Nov 17–20, 2021	(Poland) 2021 CS Warsaw Cup	9	67.39	6	103.61	7	171.00
Jan 3–9, 2022	(United States) 2022 U.S. Championships	8	73.06	8	107.66	8	180.72

Results in the 2022–23 season
Date	Event	RD		FD		Total	
Date	Event	P	Score	P	Score	P	Score
Jul 26–29, 2022	(United States) 2022 Lake Placid Ice Dance International	2	71.60	2	107.86	2	179.46
Sep 12–16, 2022	(United States) 2022 CS U.S. International Classic	3	72.66	2	106.97	2	179.63
Sep 29 – Oct 1, 2022	(Slovakia) 2022 CS Nepela Memorial	2	72.31	2	106.38	2	178.69
Nov 4–6, 2022	2022 Grand Prix de France	5	69.46	6	104.57	5	174.03
Dec 7–10, 2022	(Croatia) 2022 CS Golden Spin of Zagreb	7	65.64	4	108.80	4	174.44
Jan 23–29, 2023	(United States) 2023 U.S. Championships	7	75.52	9	107.09	8	182.61

Results in the 2023–24 season
Date	Event	RD		FD		Total	
Date	Event	P	Score	P	Score	P	Score
Aug 1–2, 2023	(United States) 2023 Lake Placid Ice Dance International	3	72.78	3	105.17	3	177.95
Sep 14–16, 2023	(Canada) 2023 CS Autumn Classic International	1	77.02	2	114.18	1	191.20
Oct 27–29, 2023	2023 Skate Canada International	6	72.12	6	109.34	6	181.46
Nov 10–12, 2023	2023 Cup of China	4	73.29	4	111.29	4	184.58
Jan 22–28, 2024	(United States) 2024 U.S. Championships	7	73.81	5	110.94	5	184.75

Results in the 2024–25 season
Date	Event	RD		FD		Total	
Date	Event	P	Score	P	Score	P	Score
July 30–31, 2024	(United States) 2024 Lake Placid Ice Dance International	3	74.21	4	109.79	3	184.00
Oct 16–20, 2024	(France) 2024 CS Trophée Métropole Nice Côte d'Azur	3	72.82	4	108.01	3	180.83
Nov 1–3, 2024	2024 Grand Prix de France	8	71.47	9	97.29	9	168.76
Nov 15–17, 2024	(Finland) 2024 Finlandia Trophy	7	72.58	7	107.77	7	180.35
Nov 20–24, 2024	(Poland) 2024 CS Warsaw Cup	5	73.63	5	110.78	4	184.41
Jan 20–26, 2025	(United States) 2025 U.S. Championships	8	73.64	9	109.60	8	183.24

Results in the 2025–26 season
Date	Event	RD		FD		Total	
Date	Event	P	Score	P	Score	P	Score
July 29–31, 2025	(United States) 2025 Lake Placid Ice Dance International	4	71.23	4	107.69	4	178.92
Sep 11–14, 2025	(Italy) 2025 CS Lombardia Trophy	2	74.27	1	112.69	1	186.96
Oct 17–19, 2025	2025 Grand Prix de France	7	71.32	8	106.36	7	177.68
Nov 5–9, 2025	(Austria) 2025 Ice Challenge	1	70.91	1	105.94	1	176.85
Nov 25–30, 2025	(Estonia) 2025 CS Tallinn Trophy	3	74.03	5	108.78	4	182.81
Jan 4–11, 2026	(United States) 2026 U.S. Championships	8	73.54	14	96.95	11	170.49

Results in the 2026–27 season
Date	Event	RD		FD		Total	
Date	Event	P	Score	P	Score	P	Score
Jul 28–30, 2026	(United States) 2026 Lake Placid Ice Dance International	4	62.64	2	102.66	2	165.30
Sep 24–27, 2026	(Slovakia) 2026 CS Nepela Memorial	11	65.58	9	103.68	10	169.26
Oct 23–25, 2026	2026 Grand Prix de France	4	64.80	8	91.27	6	156.07
Nov 6–8, 2026	2026 Cup of China	7	64.84	7	96.20	7	161.04

=== Ice dance with Chloe Lewis ===
ISU personal best scores in the +5/-5 GOE System
Segment	Type	Score	Event
Total	TSS	139.17	2018 World Junior Championships
Rhythm dance	TSS	58.07	2018 World Junior Championships
Rhythm dance	TES	31.31	2015 JGP in Spain
Rhythm dance	PCS	27.67	2016 Winter Youth Olympics
Free dance	TSS	81.30	2016 Winter Youth Olympics
Free dance	TES	41.00	2015 JGP in Spain
Free dance	PCS	43.32	2018 World Junior Championships

Results in the 2013–14 season
Date	Event	SD		FD		Total	
Date	Event	P	Score	P	Score	P	Score
Sep 5–7, 2013	2013 JGP Mexico	5	42.50	5	61.82	5	104.32
Oct 3–5, 2013	2013 JGP Czech Republic	12	41.16	11	61.93	11	103.09
Jan 5–12, 2014	(United States) 2014 U.S. Championships (Junior)	6	46.35	6	75.79	6	122.14

Results in the 2014–15 season
Date	Event	SD		FD		Total	
Date	Event	P	Score	P	Score	P	Score
Aug 20–24, 2014	2014 JGP France	7	41.40	5	70.66	5	112.06
Jan 18–25, 2015	(United States) 2015 U.S. Championships (Junior)	8	48.18	5	77.47	7	125.65

Results in the 2015–16 season
Date	Event	SD		FD		Total	
Date	Event	P	Score	P	Score	P	Score
Sep 2–6, 2015	2015 JGP United States	3	53.57	5	74.68	5	128.25
Sep 30 – Oct 4, 2015	2015 JGP Spain	5	57.03	5	81.19	5	138.22
Jan 15–24, 2016	(United States) 2016 U.S. Championships (Junior)	7	56.02	6	80.43	6	136.45
Feb 12–21, 2016	(Norway) 2016 Winter Youth Olympics	3	55.07	2	81.30	2	136.37

Results in the 2016–17 season
Date	Event	SD		FD		Total	
Date	Event	P	Score	P	Score	P	Score
Jul 29–30, 2016	(United States) 2016 Lake Placid Ice Dance International	2	58.37	3	77.53	2	135.90
Aug 31 – Sep 4, 2016	2016 JGP Czech Republic	6	49.82	5	76.36	6	126.18
Sep 28 – Oct 2, 2016	2016 JGP Estonia	4	51.04	3	81.09	3	132.13
Jan 14–22, 2017	(United States) 2017 U.S. Championships (Junior)	4	60.60	4	87.83	4	148.43

Results in the 2017–18 season
Date	Event	SD		FD		Total	
Date	Event	P	Score	P	Score	P	Score
Aug 23–26, 2017	2017 JGP Australia	5	52.26	5	72.14	5	124.40
Oct 11–14, 2017	2017 JGP Italy	5	53.72	5	76.76	5	130.48
Dec 29, 2017 – Jan 8, 2018	(United States) 2018 U.S. Championships (Junior)	3	62.14	3	81.07	3	143.21
Mar 5–11, 2018	(Bulgaria) 2018 World Junior Championships	8	58.07	6	81.10	7	139.17
