= 2025 CS Lombardia Trophy =

Figure skating competition in Bergamo, Italy

- Type: ISU Challenger Series
- Date: 11 – 14 September
- Season: 2025–26
- Location: Bergamo, Italy
- Host: Italian Ice Sports Federation
- Venue: IceLab Arena

Champions
- Men's singles: (United States) Ilia Malinin
- Women's singles: (Japan) Rion Sumiyoshi
- Ice dance: (United States) Eva Pate and Logan Bye
- Previous: 2024 CS Lombardia Trophy
- Next: 2026 CS Lombardia Trophy
- Previous CS: 2025 CS Kinoshita Group Cup
- Next CS: 2025 CS Nebelhorn Trophy

The 2025 Lombardia Trophy was a figure skating competition sanctioned by the International Skating Union (ISU), organized and hosted by the Italian Ice Sports Federation (Italian: Federazione Italiana Sport del Ghiaccio), and the fourth event of the 2025–26 ISU Challenger Series. It was held at the IceLab Arena in Bergamo, Italy, from 11 to 14 September 2025. Medals were awarded in men's singles, women's singles, and ice dance, and skaters earned ISU World Standing points based on their results. Ilia Malinin of the United States won the men's event, Rion Sumiyoshi of Japan won the women's event, and Eva Pate and Logan Bye of the United States won the ice dance event.

== Background ==
The ISU Challenger Series was introduced in 2014. It is a series of international figure skating competitions sanctioned by the International Skating Union (ISU) and organized by ISU member nations. The objective was to ensure consistent organization and structure within a series of international competitions linked together, providing opportunities for senior-level skaters to compete at the international level and also earn ISU World Standing points. The 2025–26 Challenger Series consists of eleven events, of which the Lombardia Trophy was the fourth.

== Changes to preliminary assignments ==
The International Skating Union published the preliminary list of entrants on 19 August 2025.

Discipline	Withdrew			Ref.
Discipline	Date	Country	Skater(s)	Ref.
Men	9 September	Italy	Raffaele Francesco Zich	
Men	9 September	Ukraine	Vadym Novikov	
Women	9 September	Belgium	Jade Hovine	
Women	9 September	Estonia	Martaliis Kuslap	
Women	9 September	Germany	Ina Jungmann	
Women	9 September	Romania	Ana Sofia Beschea	
Women	9 September	Romania	Teodora Maria Gheorghe	
Women	9 September	South Korea	Kim Chae-yeon	
Men	11 September	Hungary	Aleksandr Vlasenko	
Women	11 September	Estonia	Olesja Leonova	
Women	11 September	Finland	Iida Karhunen	
Women	11 September	Italy	Elena Agostinelli	
Ice dance	11 September	Italy	Noemi Maria Tali; Noah Lafornara	

== Required performance elements ==
=== Single skating ===
Men and women competing in single skating first performed a short program on Friday, 12 September. Lasting no more than 2 minutes 40 seconds, the short program had to include the following elements:

For men: one double or triple Axel; one triple or quadruple jump; one jump combination consisting of a double jump and a triple jump, two triple jumps, or a quadruple jump and a double jump or triple jump; one flying spin; one camel spin or sit spin with a change of foot; one spin combination with a change of foot; and a step sequence using the full ice surface.

For women: one double or triple Axel; one triple jump; one jump combination consisting of a double jump and a triple jump, or two triple jumps; one flying spin; one layback spin, sideways leaning spin, camel spin, or sit spin without a change of foot; one spin combination with a change of foot; and one step sequence using the full ice surface.

Women performed their free skates on Saturday, 13 September, while men performed theirs on Sunday, 14 September. The free skate performance for both men and women could last no more than 4 minutes, and had to include the following: seven jump elements, of which one had to be an Axel-type jump; three spins, of which one had to be a spin combination, one had to be a flying spin, and one had to be a spin with only one position; a step sequence; and a choreographic sequence.

=== Ice dance ===
Couples competing in ice dance performed their rhythm dances on Saturday, 13 September. Lasting no more than 2 minutes 50 seconds, the theme of the rhythm dance this season was "music, dance styles, and feeling of the 1990s". Examples of applicable dance styles and music included, but were not limited to: pop, Latin, house, techno, hip-hop, and grunge. The rhythm dance had to include the following elements: one pattern dance step sequence, one choreographic rhythm sequence, one dance lift, one set of sequential twizzles, and one step sequence.

Couples then performed their free dances on Sunday, 14 September. The free dance performance could last no longer than 4 minutes, and had to include the following: three dance lifts, one dance spin, one set of synchronized twizzles, one step sequence in hold, one step sequence while on one skate and not touching, and three choreographic elements.

== Judging ==
Skaters were judged according to the required technical elements of their program (such as jumps and spins), as well as the overall presentation of their program, based on three program components (skating skills, presentation, and composition). Each technical element in a figure skating performance was assigned a predetermined base point value and scored by a panel of nine judges on a scale from −5 to +5 based on the quality of its execution. Each Grade of Execution (GOE) from –5 to +5 was assigned a value as indicated on the Scale of Values. For example, a triple Axel was worth a base value of 8.00 points, and a GOE of +3 was worth 2.40 points, so a triple Axel with a GOE of +3 earned 10.40 points. The judging panel's GOE for each element was determined by calculating the trimmed mean (the average after discarding the highest and lowest scores). The panel's scores for all elements were added together to generate a Total Elements Score. At the same time, the judges evaluated each performance based on the five aforementioned program components and assigned each a score from 0.25 to 10 in 0.25-point increments. The judging panel's final score for each program component was also determined by calculating the trimmed mean. Those scores were then multiplied by the factor shown on the chart below; the results were added together to generate a total Program Component Score.

Program component factoring
Discipline	Short program or Rhythm dance	Free skate or Free dance
Men	1.67	3.33
Women	1.33	2.67
Ice dance	1.33	2.00

Deductions were applied for certain violations, such as time infractions, stops and restarts, or falls. The Total Elements Score and Program Component Score were then added together, minus any deductions, to generate a final performance score for each skater or team.

== Medal summary ==
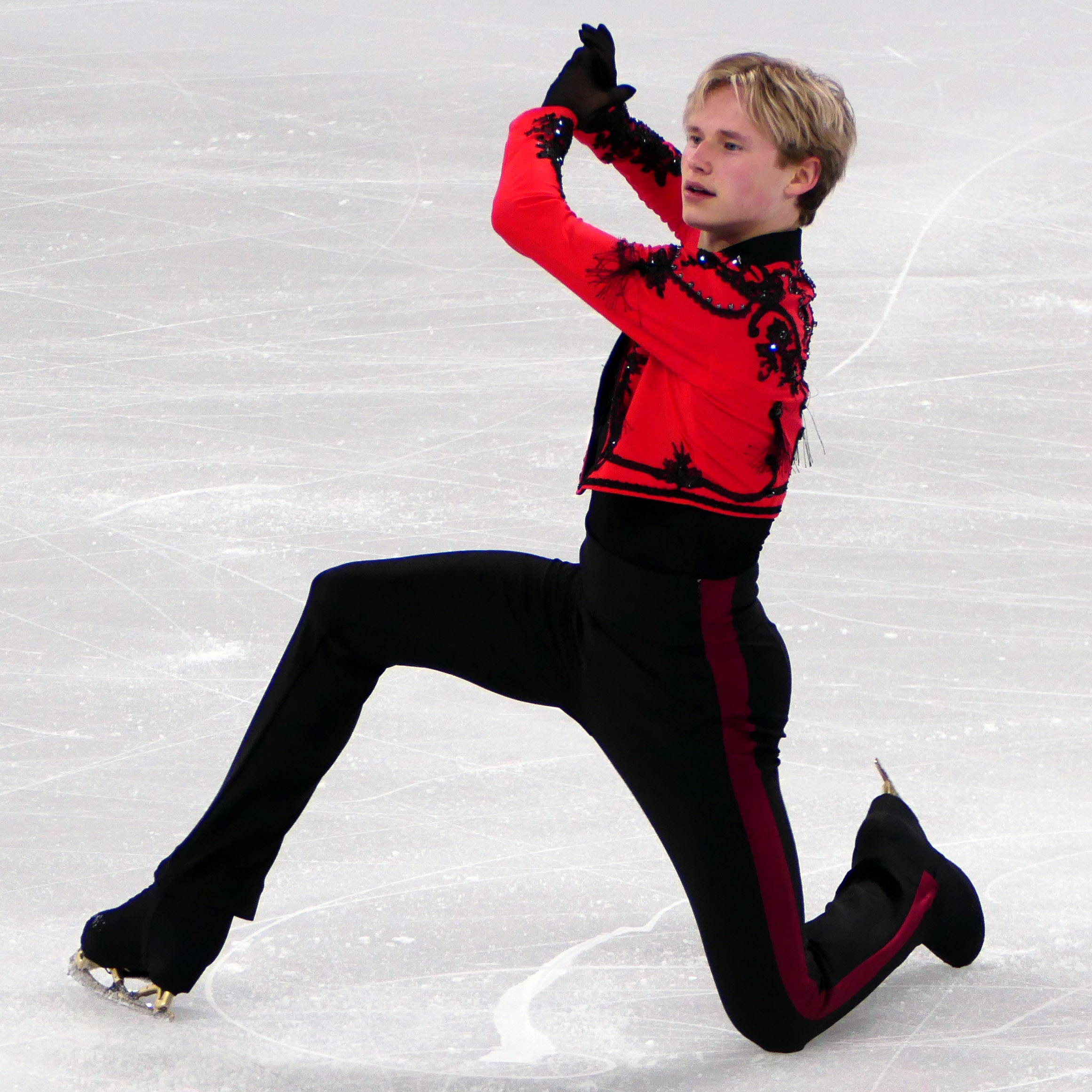
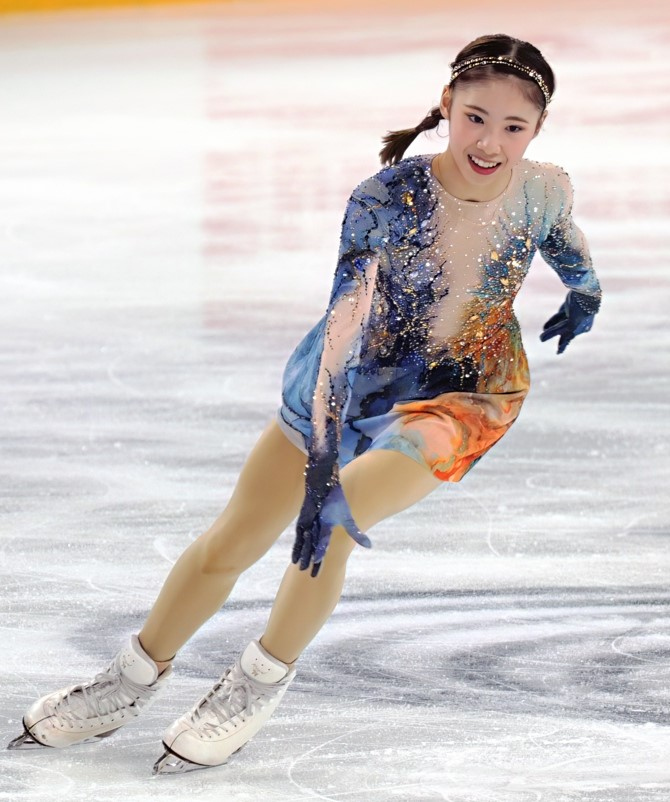
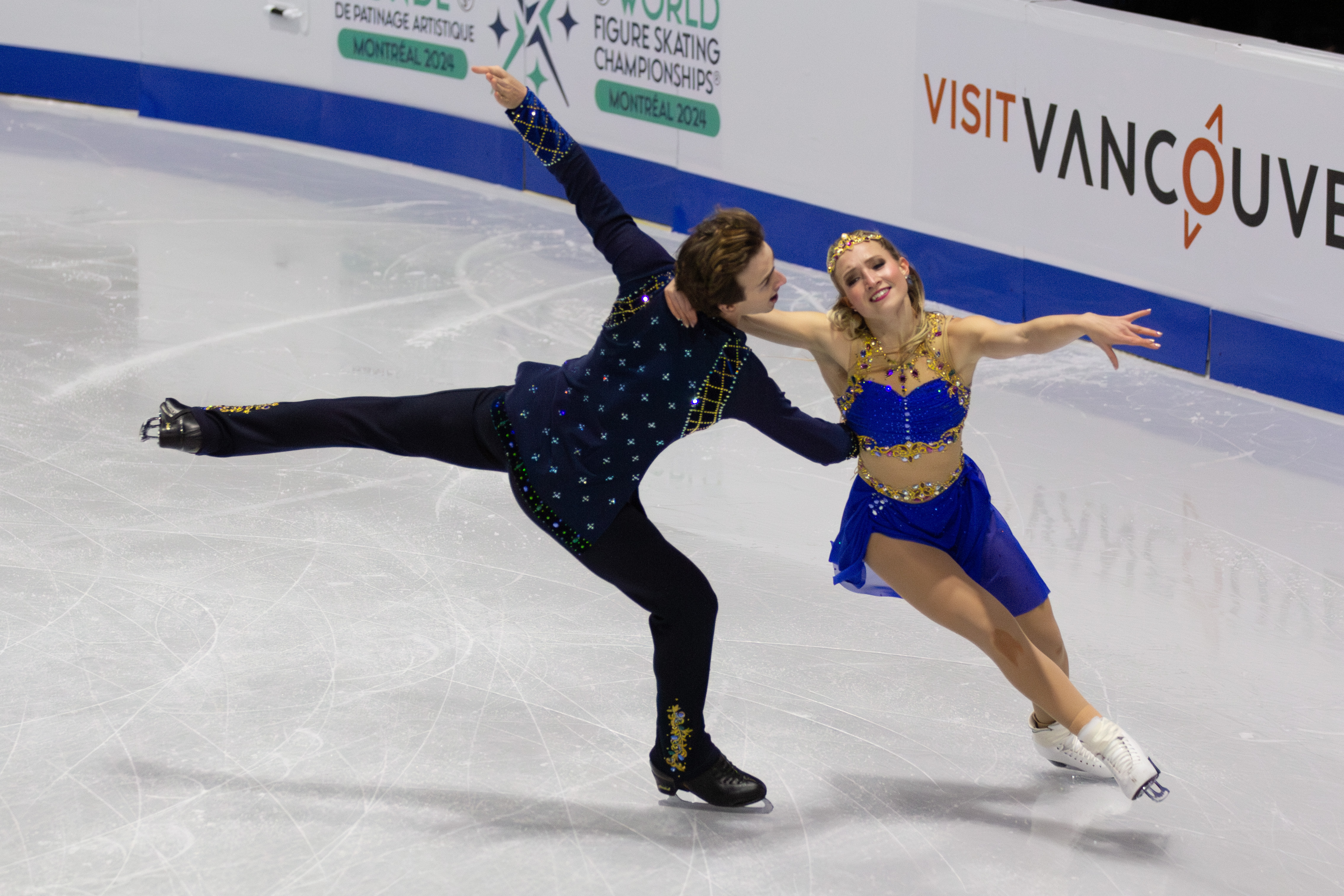
The 2025 Lombardia Trophy champions: Ilia Malinin of the United States (men's singles); Rion Sumiyoshi of Japan (women's singles); and Eva Pate and Logan Bye of the United States (ice dance)

Medalists
Discipline	Gold	Silver	Bronze
Men	(United States) Ilia Malinin	(Japan) Yuma Kagiyama	(Italy) Nikolaj Memola
Women	(Japan) Rion Sumiyoshi	(Japan) Ami Nakai	(United States) Sarah Everhardt
Ice dance	(United States); Eva Pate; Logan Bye	(Czech Republic); Kateřina Mrázková; Daniel Mrázek	(United States); Katarina Wolfkostin; Dimitry Tsarevski

== Results ==
=== Men's singles ===
Men's results
Rank	Skater	Nation	Total points	SP		FS	
1st place, gold medalist(s)	Ilia Malinin	United States	306.65	1	108.87	1	197.78
2nd place, silver medalist(s)	Yuma Kagiyama	Japan	285.91	2	95.44	2	190.47
3rd place, bronze medalist(s)	Nikolaj Memola	Italy	265.37	4	88.15	3	177.22
4	Shun Sato	Japan	254.14	8	78.06	4	176.08
5	Adam Siao Him Fa	France	244.36	6	86.06	5	158.30
6	Kao Miura	Japan	233.02	3	92.76	10	140.26
7	Andreas Nordebäck	Sweden	230.37	10	75.45	6	154.92
8	Luc Economides	France	229.19	7	79.82	7	149.37
9	Maxim Naumov	United States	223.43	9	76.71	9	146.72
10	Kyrylo Marsak	Ukraine	223.20	11	75.35	8	147.85
11	Matteo Rizzo	Italy	213.32	5	86.60	11	126.72
12	Corentin Spinar	France	194.88	12	70.48	12	124.40
13	Ivan Shmuratko	Ukraine	183.48	13	66.26	13	117.22
14	Makar Suntsev	Finland	171.16	14	60.39	14	110.77
15	Tobia Oellerer	Austria	157.06	15	50.99	15	106.07
16	Filip Kaymachiev	Bulgaria	113.40	16	36.67	16	76.73

=== Women's singles ===
Women's results
Rank	Skater	Nation	Total points	SP		FS	
1st place, gold medalist(s)	Rion Sumiyoshi	Japan	209.59	3	68.87	1	140.72
2nd place, silver medalist(s)	Ami Nakai	Japan	206.04	5	68.30	2	137.74
3rd place, bronze medalist(s)	Sarah Everhardt	United States	199.91	2	69.16	3	130.75
4	Alysa Liu	United States	197.84	1	69.62	5	128.22
5	Lara Naki Gutmann	Italy	195.95	6	67.70	4	128.25
6	Kim Seo-young	South Korea	190.12	4	68.75	6	121.37
7	Olivia Lisko	Finland	173.95	8	63.15	7	110.80
8	Rino Matsuike	Japan	170.72	7	63.39	8	107.33
9	Chiara Minighini	Italy	158.86	10	57.14	9	101.72
10	Linnea Ceder	Finland	157.24	9	57.22	10	100.02
11	Josefin Taljegård	Sweden	154.14	11	54.89	12	99.25
12	Ekaterina Kurakova	Poland	151.98	12	53.23	13	98.75
13	Jogailė Aglinskytė	Lithuania	150.01	13	50.20	11	99.81
14	Gian-Quen Isaacs	South Africa	128.42	16	47.02	14	81.40
15	Ariadna Gupta Espada	Spain	125.75	15	47.74	15	78.01
16	Selmasiri Bella Larsen	Denmark	104.06	18	36.49	16	67.57
17	Vivienne Contarino	Italy	99.76	19	35.98	18	63.78
18	Taisiia Spesivtseva	Ukraine	99.22	21	33.57	17	65.65
19	Sofiia Hryhorenko	Ukraine	96.12	17	44.47	20	51.65
20	Jolanda Vos	Netherlands	93.90	20	33.95	19	59.95
WD	Julija Lovrencic	Slovenia	Withdrew	14	49.28	Withdrew from competition	

=== Ice dance ===
Ice dance results
Rank	Team	Nation	Total points	RD		FD	
1st place, gold medalist(s)	Eva Pate; Logan Bye	United States	186.96	2	74.27	1	112.69
2nd place, silver medalist(s)	Kateřina Mrázková; Daniel Mrázek	Czech Republic	181.95	1	74.66	3	107.29
3rd place, bronze medalist(s)	Katarina Wolfkostin; Dimitry Tsarevski	United States	180.20	3	69.73	2	110.47
4	Natacha Lagouge; Arnaud Caffa	France	170.34	4	66.14	4	104.20
5	Victoria Manni; Carlo Röthlisberger	Italy	166.57	5	65.02	5	101.55
6	Mariia Ignateva; Danijil Szemko	Hungary	159.23	6	62.33	7	96.90
7	Marie Dupayage; Thomas Nabais	France	156.66	9	58.45	6	98.21
8	Charise Matthaei; Max Liebers	Germany	149.78	7	60.82	8	88.96
9	Maria Kazakova; Vladislav Kasinskij	Georgia	141.63	10	56.73	10	84.90
10	Louise Bordet; Martin Chardain	France	138.79	12	53.35	9	85.44
11	Mariia Pinchuk; Mykyta Pogorielov	Ukraine	135.90	13	52.08	11	83.82
12	Zoe Larson; Andrii Kapran	Ukraine	127.56	11	55.01	13	74.33
13	Zofia Grzegorzewska; Oleg Muratov	Poland	125.63	14	51.30	12	74.33
WD	Giulia Isabella Paolino; Andrea Tuba	Italy	Withdrew	8	58.73	Withdrew from competition	

== Works cited ==
- "Special Regulations & Technical Rules – Single & Pair Skating and Ice Dance 2024" (PDF). International Skating Union. Archived (PDF) from the original on 3 June 2025.
