= ISU Junior Grand Prix in Estonia =

International figure skating competition

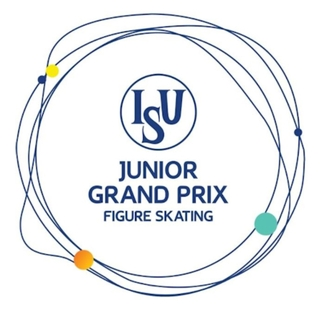
- Status: Inactive
- Genre: ISU Junior Grand Prix
- Frequency: Occasional
- Location: Tallinn
- Country: Estonia
- Inaugurated: 2005
- Most recent: 2016
- Organizer: Estonian Skating Union

The ISU Junior Grand Prix in Estonia – also known as the Tallinn Cup – is an international figure skating competition sanctioned by the International Skating Union (ISU), organized and hosted by the Estonian Skating Union (Estonian: Eesti Uisuliit). It is held periodically as an event of the ISU Junior Grand Prix of Figure Skating (JGP), a series of international competitions exclusively for junior-level skaters. Medals may be awarded in men's singles, women's singles, pair skating, and ice dance. Skaters earn points based on their results at the qualifying competitions each season, and the top skaters or teams in each discipline are invited to then compete at the Junior Grand Prix of Figure Skating Final.

== History ==
The ISU Junior Grand Prix of Figure Skating (JGP) was established by the International Skating Union (ISU) in 1997 and consists of a series of seven international figure skating competitions exclusively for junior-level skaters. The locations of the Junior Grand Prix events change every year. While all seven competitions feature the men's, women's, and ice dance events, only four competitions each season feature the pairs event. Skaters earn points based on their results each season, and the top skaters or teams in each discipline are then invited to compete at the Junior Grand Prix of Figure Skating Final.

Skaters are eligible to compete on the junior-level circuit if they are at least 13 years old before 1 July of the respective season, but not yet 19 (for single skaters), 21 (for men and women in ice dance and women in pair skating), or 23 (for men in pair skating). Competitors are chosen by their respective skating federations. The number of entries allotted to each ISU member nation in each discipline is determined by their results at the prior World Junior Figure Skating Championships.

Estonia hosted its first Junior Grand Prix competition in 2005 in Tallinn. Tommy Steenberg of the United States won the men's event, Elene Gedevanishvili of Georgia won the women's event, Aaryn Smith and Will Chitwood of the United States won the pairs event, and Anastasia Gorshkova and Ilia Tkachenko of Russia won the ice dance event. Estonia hosted five subsequent events in Tallinn, the most recent iteration being held in 2016.

== Medalists ==
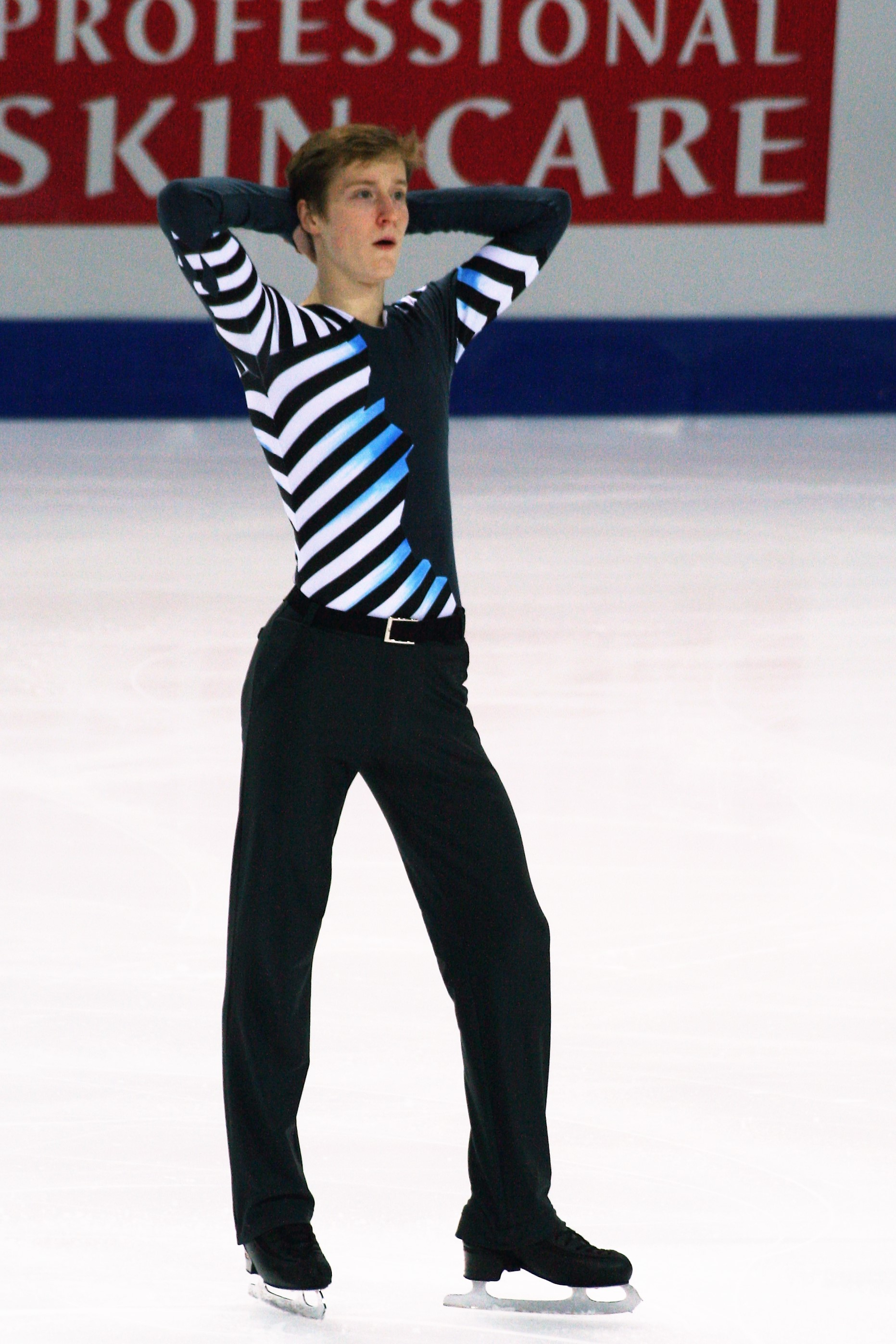
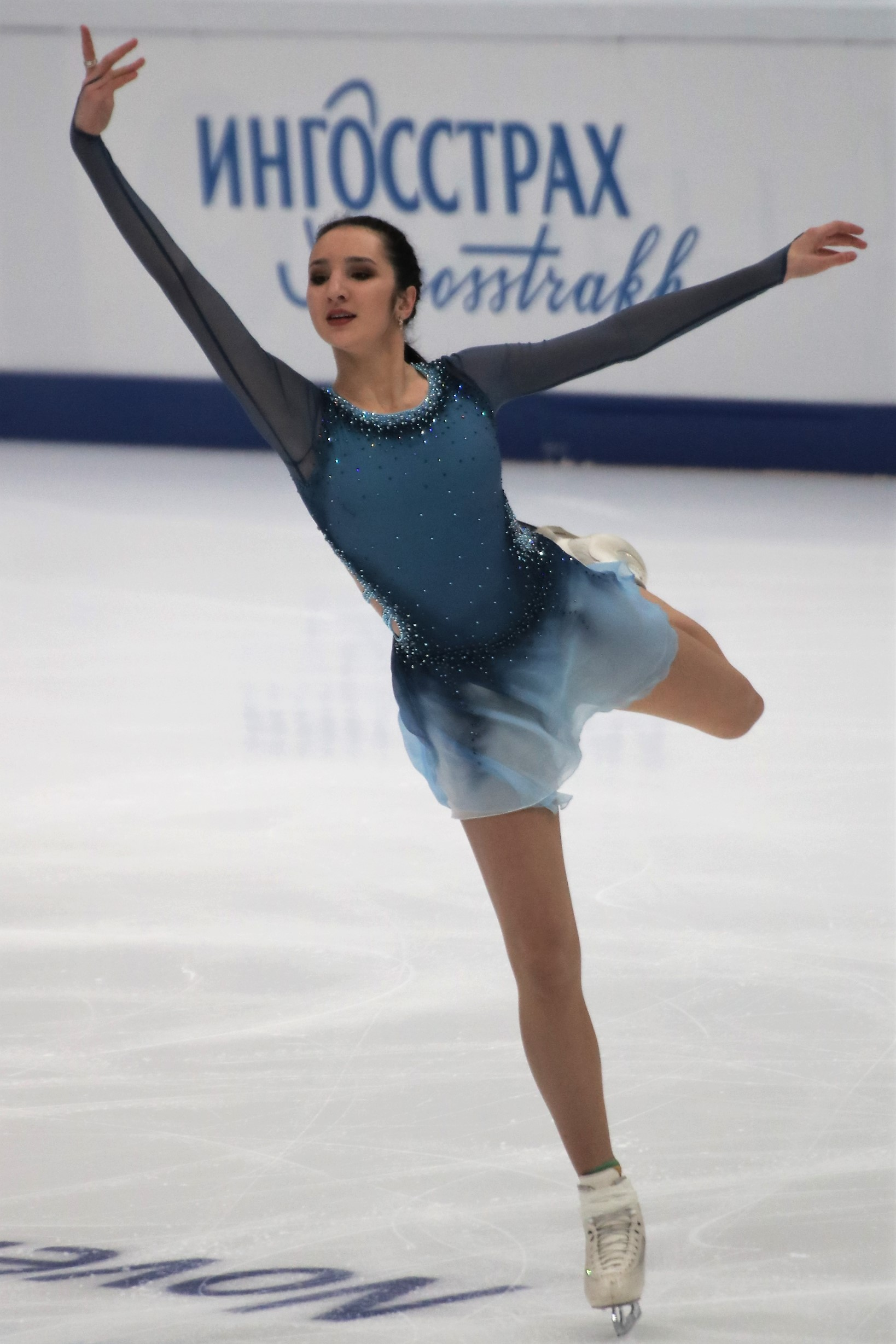
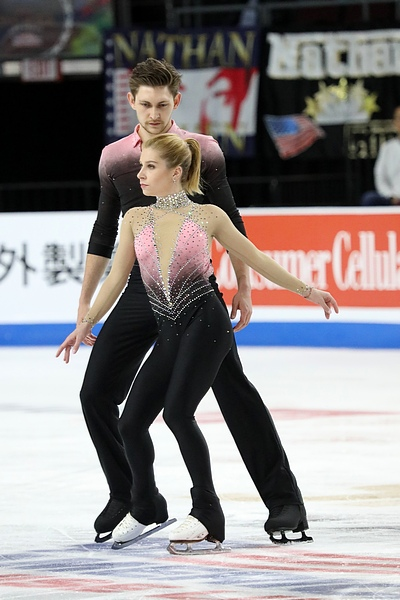
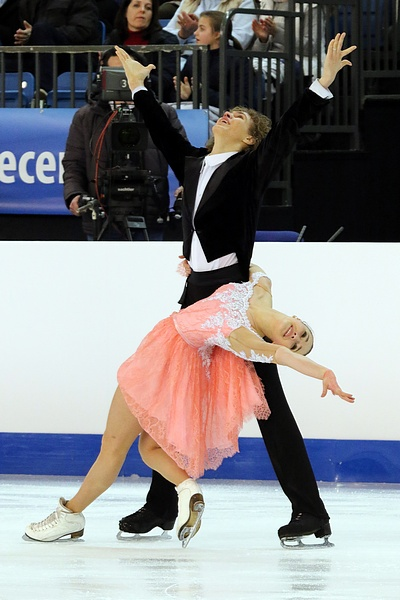
The 2016 Tallinn Cup champions: Alexander Samarin of Russia (men's singles); Polina Tsurskaya of Russia (women's singles); Ekaterina Alexandrovskaya and Harley Windsor of Australia (pair skating); and Alla Loboda and Pavel Drozd of Russia (ice dance)

=== Men's singles ===
Men's event medalists
Year	Location	Gold	Silver	Bronze	Ref.
2005	Tallinn	(United States) Tommy Steenberg	(Japan) Kosuke Morinaga	(Russia) Ivan Tretiakov	
2007	Tallinn	(China) Guan Jinlin	(Russia) Artur Gachinski	(China) Yang Chao	
2011	Tallinn	(United States) Joshua Farris	(Russia) Maxim Kovtun	(Japan) Shoma Uno	
2013	Tallinn	(China) Jin Boyang	(Russia) Mikhail Kolyada	(Philippines) Michael Christian Martinez	
2014	Tallinn	(Russia) Alexander Petrov	(Japan) Sōta Yamamoto	(China) Zhang He	
2016	Tallinn	(Russia) Alexander Samarin	(Canada) Roman Sadovsky	(United States) Vincent Zhou	

=== Women's singles ===
Women's event medalists
Year	Location	Gold	Silver	Bronze	Ref.
2005	Tallinn	(Georgia (country)) Elene Gedevanishvili	(Russia) Veronika Kropotina	(Finland) Kiira Korpi	
2007	Tallinn	(Japan) Yuki Nishino	(United States) Blake Rosenthal	(Estonia) Svetlana Issakova	
2011	Tallinn	(United States) Gracie Gold	(Japan) Risa Shōji	(United States) Samantha Cesario	
2013	Tallinn	(Russia) Serafima Sakhanovich	(Russia) Elizaveta Yuschenko	(Japan) Miyabi Oba	
2014	Tallinn	(Japan) Miyu Nakashio	(Russia) Maria Sotskova	(Russia) Alsu Kaiumova	
2016	Tallinn	(Russia) Polina Tsurskaya	(Russia) Elizaveta Nugumanova	(Japan) Mako Yamashita	

=== Pairs ===
Pairs event medalists
Year	Location	Gold	Silver	Bronze	Ref.
2005	Tallinn	(United States); Aaryn Smith; Will Chitwood	(Russia); Elizaveta Levshina; Konstantin Gavrin	(United States); Lilly Pixley; John Salway	
2007	Tallinn	(Russia); Ekaterina Sheremetieva; Mikhail Kuznetsov	(Canada); Amanda Velenosi; Mark Fernandez	(China); Zhang Yue; Wang Lei	
2011	Tallinn	(Canada); Katherine Bobak; Ian Beharry	(United States); Britney Simpson; Matthew Blackmer	(United States); Jessica Calalang; Zack Sidhu	
2013	Tallinn	(China); Yu Xiaoyu; Jin Yang	(Russia); Vasilisa Davankova; Andrei Deputat	(Russia); Evgenia Tarasova; Vladimir Morozov	
2014	Tallinn	(Russia); Maria Vigalova; Egor Zakroev	(Russia); Kamilla Gainetdinova; Sergei Alekseev	(Russia); Anastasia Gubanova; Alexei Sintsov	
2016	Tallinn	(Australia); Ekaterina Alexandrovskaya; Harley Windsor	(Russia); Alina Ustimkina; Nikita Volodin	(Russia); Ekaterina Borisova; Dmitry Sopot	

=== Ice dance ===
Ice dance event medalists
Year	Location	Gold	Silver	Bronze	Ref.
2005	Tallinn	(Russia); Anastasia Gorshkova; Ilia Tkachenko	(Canada); Allie Hann-McCurdy; Michael Coreno	(Estonia); Grethe Grünberg; Kristian Rand	
2007	Tallinn	(United States); Madison Chock; Greg Zuerlein	(Ukraine); Alisa Agafonova; Dmitri Dun	(Canada); Joanna Lenko; Mitchell Islam	
2011	Tallinn	(Russia); Anna Yanovskaya; Sergey Mozgov	(Estonia); Irina Štork; Taavi Rand	(Russia); Evgenia Kosigina; Nikolai Moroshkin	
2013	Tallinn	(Russia); Anna Yanovskaya; Sergey Mozgov	(Ukraine); Oleksandra Nazarova; Maksym Nikitin	(Russia); Daria Morozova; Mikhail Zhirnov	
2014	Tallinn	(Russia); Anna Yanovskaya; Sergey Mozgov	(Canada); Mackenzie Bent; Garrett MacKeen	(Ukraine); Oleksandra Nazarova; Maksym Nikitin	
2016	Tallinn	(Russia); Alla Loboda; Pavel Drozd	(Russia); Anastasia Skoptsova; Kirill Aleshin	(United States); Chloe Lewis; Logan Bye	
