= Chloe Lewis (figure skater) =

American ice dancer (born 2000)

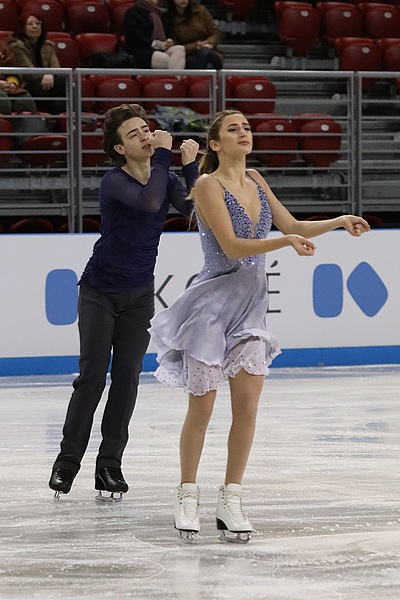
- Chloe Lewis and Logan Bye at the 2018 World Junior Championships

Personal information
- Full name: Chloe Rose Lewis
- Born: June 18, 2000 (age 26) Portland, Oregon, U.S.
- Home town: Novi, Michigan, U.S.
- Height: 5 ft 3 in (1.60 m)

Figure skating career
- Country: United States
- Discipline: Ice dance
- Partner: Logan Bye
- Began skating: 2005
- Retired: June 6, 2019

Medal record
Winter Youth Olympics
Silver medal – second place	2016 Lillehammer	Ice dance

Chloe Rose Lewis (born June 18, 2000) is an American former ice dancer. With her former partner Logan Bye, she is the 2016 Youth Olympic silver medalist.

== Personal life ==
Chloe Rose Lewis was born on June 18, 2000, in Portland, Oregon. She has two older brothers and a cat. She attended the Catlin Gabel School in Portland, Oregon, where she lived before moving to Novi, Michigan, around 2014.

== Career ==
Lewis started learning to skate in 2004. At age seven, she began taking ice dancing lessons, instructed by Judy Blumberg.

=== Intermediate and novice career ===
Lewis and Logan Bye met in February 2010 at a rink in Sun Valley, Idaho, and began training together in August 2010. Because they lived in different cities, they trained half a month together, half apart during their first two seasons. In the 2010–11 season, they qualified to compete on the intermediate level at the U.S. Junior Championships and finished sixth.

Lewis/Bye placed fourth on the novice level at the 2012 U.S. Championships. They began training together regularly after Bye moved to Beaverton, Oregon, in autumn 2012. They won the novice title at the 2013 U.S. Championships.

=== Junior career: Youth Olympics silver ===
During the 2013–14 season, Lewis/Bye were coached by Ikaika Young in Portland; by Judy Blumberg in Sun Valley, Idaho; and by Igor Shpilband in Novi. Making their ISU Junior Grand Prix (JGP) debut, they placed fifth in September 2013 in Mexico City, Mexico, and 11th the following month in Ostrava, Czech Republic. The two finished sixth on the junior level at the 2014 U.S. Championships.

In 2014–15, Lewis/Bye were coached by Shpilband and Blumberg in Novi. They placed fifth in Courchevel, France at their sole 2015 JGP assignment and seventh in junior ice dancing at the 2015 U.S. Championships.

Coached by Shpilband, Lewis/Bye placed fifth at both of their 2015–16 JGP assignments. In January 2016, they finished 6th on the junior level at the 2016 U.S. Championships. In February, they represented the United States at the 2016 Youth Olympics in Hamar, Norway. Ranked third in the short dance and second in the free dance, they were awarded the silver medal behind Anastasia Shpilevaya / Grigory Smirnov and ahead of Anastasia Skoptsova / Kirill Aleshin.

== Programs ==
=== Ice dance with Logan Bye ===
Season	Short dance	Free dance
2013–2014	Quickstep: Call Me Irresponsible by Bobby Darin; Foxtrot: Oh Marie by Michael Bublé; Waltz	Theme from Schindler's List by John Williams; Hava Nagila by Abraham Zevi Idelsohn; Dance for Me, Wallis (from W.E.) by Abel Korzeniowski
2014–2015	Samba: Chiqui Chiqui Boom by David Civera; Mambo: Mambo Jambo (Qué rico el mambo); Mambo: It's Mambo Time	Preludes by Frédéric Chopin: Prelude in C minor; Prelude in F minor; Prelude in E minor
2015–2016	Waltz: Valse triste by Jean Sibelius	Tristeza Separacion; Milonga Loca by Astor Piazzolla; Soledad; Concerto para quinteto by Gidon Kremer
2016–2017	Blues: Save My Soul; Swing: Jumpin' Jack by Big Bad Voodoo Daddy	Rhapsody in Blue by George Gershwin; Embraceable You; I've Got Rhythm performed by Judy Garland
2017–2018	Carino; Como Ama Una Mujer by Jennifer Lopez; On the Floor by Jennifer Lopez ft. Pitbull	Final Breath; Place de République; Metal Gleamed in Twilight by Cœur de Pirate

== Competitive highlights ==
=== Ice dance with Logan Bye ===
- JGP – Event of the ISU Junior Grand Prix Series

Competition placements at junior level
Season	2013–14	2014–15	2015–16	2016–17	2017–18
World Junior Championships					7th
Winter Youth Olympics			2nd		
JGP Australia					5th
JGP Czech Republic	11th			6th	
JGP Estonia				3rd	
JGP France		5th			
JGP Italy					5th
JGP Mexico	5th				
JGP Spain			5th		
JGP United States			5th		
Lake Placid Ice Dance				2nd	
U.S. Championships	6th	7th	6th	4th	3rd

== Detailed results ==
=== Ice dance with Logan Bye ===
ISU personal best scores in the +5/-5 GOE System
Segment	Type	Score	Event
Total	TSS	139.17	2018 World Junior Championships
Rhythm dance	TSS	58.07	2018 World Junior Championships
Rhythm dance	TES	31.31	2015 JGP Spain
Rhythm dance	PCS	27.67	2016 Winter Youth Olympics
Free dance	TSS	81.30	2016 Winter Youth Olympics
Free dance	TES	41.00	2015 JGP Spain
Free dance	PCS	43.32	2018 World Junior Championships

Results in the 2013–14 season
Date	Event	SD		FD		Total	
Date	Event	P	Score	P	Score	P	Score
Sep 5–7, 2013	2013 JGP Mexico	5	42.50	5	61.82	5	104.32
Oct 3–5, 2013	2013 JGP Czech Republic	12	41.16	11	61.93	11	103.09
Jan 5–12, 2014	(United States) 2014 U.S. Championships (Junior)	6	46.35	6	75.79	6	122.14

Results in the 2014–15 season
Date	Event	SD		FD		Total	
Date	Event	P	Score	P	Score	P	Score
Aug 20–24, 2014	2014 JGP France	7	41.40	5	70.66	5	112.06
Jan 18–25, 2015	(United States) 2015 U.S. Championships (Junior)	8	48.18	5	77.47	7	125.65

Results in the 2015–16 season
Date	Event	SD		FD		Total	
Date	Event	P	Score	P	Score	P	Score
Sep 2–6, 2015	2015 JGP United States	3	53.57	5	74.68	5	128.25
Sep 30 – Oct 4, 2015	2015 JGP Spain	5	57.03	5	81.19	5	138.22
Jan 15–24, 2016	(United States) 2016 U.S. Championships (Junior)	7	56.02	6	80.43	6	136.45
Feb 12–21, 2016	(Norway) 2016 Winter Youth Olympics	3	55.07	2	81.30	2	136.37

Results in the 2016–17 season
Date	Event	SD		FD		Total	
Date	Event	P	Score	P	Score	P	Score
Jul 29–30, 2016	(United States) 2016 Lake Placid Ice Dance International	2	58.37	3	77.53	2	135.90
Aug 31 – Sep 4, 2016	2016 JGP Czech Republic	6	49.82	5	76.36	6	126.18
Sep 28 – Oct 2, 2016	2016 JGP Estonia	4	51.04	3	81.09	3	132.13
Jan 14–22, 2017	(United States) 2017 U.S. Championships (Junior)	4	60.60	4	87.83	4	148.43

Results in the 2017–18 season
Date	Event	SD		FD		Total	
Date	Event	P	Score	P	Score	P	Score
Aug 23–26, 2017	2017 JGP Australia	5	52.26	5	72.14	5	124.40
Oct 11–14, 2017	2017 JGP Italy	5	53.72	5	76.76	5	130.48
Dec 29, 2017 – Jan 8, 2018	(United States) 2018 U.S. Championships (Junior)	3	62.14	3	81.07	3	143.21
Mar 5–11, 2018	(Bulgaria) 2018 World Junior Championships	8	58.07	6	81.10	7	139.17
