= Children (Joe South song) =

Song by Joe South

Single by Joe South

from the album Don't It Make You Want to Go Home?
- B-side: "Clock Up on the Wall"
- Released: March 1970
- Label: Capitol
- Songwriter: Joe South

Joe South singles chronology
"Walk a Mile in My Shoes" (1969)	"Children" (1970)	"Fool Me" (1971)

"Children" is a song written by Joe South, originally from his 1969 album Don't It Make You Want to Go Home?. In 1970, he released it as a single.

The song became a hit in the U.S. (#48) and Canadian (#33) pop charts. It was a bigger hit on the Adult Contemporary charts of both nations.

== Chart history ==
Chart (1970)	Peak position
Australia (Kent Music Report)	41
Canada RPM Adult Contemporary	31
Canada RPM Top Singles	33
US Billboard Hot 100	51
US Billboard Easy Listening	32
US Cash Box Top 100	48

== Johnny Cash version ==
"Children"

Single by Johnny Cash

from the album The Gospel Road
- B-side: "Last Supper"
- Released: January 26, 1973
- Genre: Country
- Label: Columbia 4-45786
- Songwriter: Joe South
- Producer: Larry Butler

Johnny Cash singles chronology
"Any Old Wind That Blows" (1972)	"Children" (1973)	"Praise the Lord and Pass the Soup" (1973)

Audio
- "Children" on YouTube

The song was recorded by Johnny Cash for the 20th Century Fox film The Gospel Road and its double soundtrack album of the same name. Released as a single in 1973 (Columbia 4-45786, with "Last Supper" from the same album on the opposite side), Cash's version of "Children" reached number 30 on U.S. Billboard's country chart.

=== Track listing ===
7" single (Columbia 4-45786, 1973)
No.	Title	Writer(s)	Length
1.	"Children"	J. South	2:48
2.	"Last Supper"	L. Gatlin	2:55

=== Charts ===
Chart (1973)	Peak position
US Hot Country Songs (Billboard)	30
