= Walk in my shoes =

Walk in my shoes may refer to:

Similar names

- "Walk a Mile in My Shoes" is a 1969 song written by Joe South.
- Walk a Mile in My Shoes: The Essential '70s Masters is a box set five-disc compilation of the recorded work of Elvis Presley during the decade of the 1970s, released in 1995
- "Walking in My Shoes" is Depeche Mode's 28th UK single, 1993
- Walk in My Shoes: Conversations between a Civil Rights Legend and his Godson on the Journey Ahead is a book by Kabir Sehgal and Andrew Young released in 2010
