= Promised Land (Elvis Presley album) =

Studio album by Elvis Presley
- Released: January 8, 1975
- Recorded: December 10–15, 1973
- Studio: Stax (Memphis)
- Genre: Country
- Length: 28:17
- Label: RCA Victor
- Producer: Felton Jarvis

Elvis Presley chronology
Having Fun with Elvis on Stage (1974)	Promised Land (1975)	Today (1975)

Singles from Promised Land
- 1. "If You Talk in Your Sleep" Released: May 10, 1974; 2. "Promised Land" Released: September 27, 1974

Professional ratings
Review scores
Source	Rating
AllMusic	4/5 stars
Christgau's Record Guide	B
MusicHound	2.5/5 stars
Rough Guides	4/5 stars

Promised Land is the twenty-first studio album by American singer and musician Elvis Presley, released by RCA Records on January 8, 1975. It was recorded in December 1973 at Stax Records studios in Memphis and released on Presley's 40th birthday in January, 1975. In the US the album reached number 47 on the Billboard Top 200 chart and number 1 in Billboard's Top Country LPs chart, as well as the Cashbox Country albums chart. In the UK the album reached number 21.

== Content ==
The material was the second pick from the December 1973 session, as the songs considered strongest had been issued on Good Times. The title track, a cover of the 1965 hit by Chuck Berry, was issued earlier as a single on September 27, 1974, and hit number 14 on the Billboard Hot 100 and the UK top ten. Its flip side, "It's Midnight", reached 9 on the Country Charts. Another hit single from the album was "If You Talk in Your Sleep" reaching 17 on the Billboard Hot 100. "Promised Land" was used for the 1997 film Men in Black.

== Reissues ==
RCA reissued the album on CD in 2000, and it added all the tracks of the album Good Times as tracks 11–18 (except "Take Good Care of Her" and "I've Got A Thing About You, Baby", which are from the July 1973 sessions) – in effect compiling the Stax sessions of December 1973. In 2011, the FTD (Follow That Dream) collectors label released an expanded, 48-track version of the album including outtakes.

== Track listing ==
=== Original release ===
Side A
No.	Title	Writer(s)	Recording date	Length
1.	"Promised Land"	Chuck Berry	December 15, 1973	2:57
2.	"There's a Honky Tonk Angel (Who'll Take Me Back In)"	Troy Seals, Denny Rice	December 15, 1973	3:01
3.	"Help Me"	Larry Gatlin	December 12, 1973	2:27
4.	"Mr. Songman"	Donnie Sumner	December 12, 1973	2:08
5.	"Love Song of the Year"	Chris Christian	December 12, 1973	3:33

Side B
No.	Title	Writer(s)	Recording date	Length
1.	"It's Midnight"	Billy Edd Wheeler and Jerry Chesnut	December 10, 1973	3:21
2.	"Your Love's Been a Long Time Coming"	Rory Bourke	December 15, 1973	3:47
3.	"If You Talk in Your Sleep"	Red West, Johnny Christopher	December 11, 1973	2:35
4.	"Thinking About You"	Tim Baty	December 12, 1973	3:00
5.	"You Asked Me To"	Waylon Jennings, Billy Joe Shaver	December 11, 1973	2:52

=== 2000 CD reissue bonus tracks ===
Tracks 1–10 are from the original release
No.	Title	Writer(s)	Recording date	Length
11.	"Loving Arms"	Tom Jans	December 13, 1973	2:49
12.	"I Got a Feelin' in My Body"	Dennis Linde	December 10, 1973	3:37
13.	"If That Isn't Love"	Dottie Rambo	December 16, 1973	3:31
14.	"She Wears My Ring"	Felice Bryant and Boudleaux Bryant	December 16, 1973	3:10
15.	"My Boy"	Bill Martin, Phil Coulter, Jean-Pierre Bourtayre, Claude François	December 13, 1973	3:21
16.	"Spanish Eyes"	Bert Kaempfert, Eddie Snyder, Charles Singleton	December 16, 1973	2:22
17.	"Talk About the Good Times"	Jerry Reed	December 14, 1973	2:22
18.	"Good Time Charlie's Got the Blues"	Danny O'Keefe	December 13, 1973	3:09

=== Follow That Dream CD reissue ===
Disc one
No.	Title	Length
1.	"Promised Land"
2.	"There's A Honky Tonk Angel"
3.	"Help Me"
4.	"Mr. Songman"
5.	"Love Song Of The Year"
6.	"It's Midnight"
7.	"Your Love's Been A Long Time Coming"
8.	"If You Talk In Your Sleep"
9.	"Thinking About You"
10.	"You Asked Me To"
11.	"Promised Land" (takes 3, 4)
12.	"There's A Honky Tonk Angel" (take 4/composite 5, 3, 8)
13.	"Help Me" (take 1 remixed)
14.	"Mr. Songman" (take 2)
15.	"Love Song Of The Year" (take 1)
16.	"It's Midnight" (take 7)
17.	"Your Love's Been A Long Time Coming" (take 10)
18.	"If You Talk In Your Sleep" (take 5)
19.	"Thinking About You" (take 4)
20.	"You Asked Me To" (take 3A)
21.	"Promised Land" (take 5)
22.	"Love Song Of The Year" (takes 3, 4, 6, 7)
23.	"It's Midnight" (take 11)
24.	"You Asked Me To" (take 2B)

Disc two
No.	Title	Length
1.	"It's Midnight" (takes 1–4, 8, 9)
2.	"Love Song Of The Year"
3.	"Thinking About You" (takes 2, 3)
4.	"You Asked Me To" (take 1)
5.	"Your Love's Been A Long Time Coming" (takes 2, 3, 4)
6.	"Promised Land" (take 2)
7.	"Mr. Songman" (take 1)
8.	"There's A Honky Tonk Angel" (take 1)
9.	"If You Talk In Your Sleep" (takes 6, 9 undubbed)
10.	"It's Midnight" (take 10)
11.	"Thinking About You" (takes 5, 6)
12.	"Love Song Of The Year" (take 2)
13.	"You Asked Me To" (take 3B)
14.	"There's A Honky Tonk Angel" (takes 6, 7, 8 rough mix)
15.	"Mr. Songman" (takes 3, 5)
16.	"Promised Land" (take 6 undubbed)
17.	"Your Love's Been A Long Time Coming" (takes 8, 9 unedited undubbed)

== Personnel ==
- Elvis Presley – lead vocals; harmony vocals on "Promised Land"
- James Burton – lead guitar
- Johnny Christopher – rhythm guitar
- Charlie Hodge – acoustic rhythm guitar
- Norbert Putnam – bass guitar
- David Briggs – piano, Hammond organ, overdubbed tambourine on "Promised Land"
- Per Erik "Pete" Hallin – clavinet on "Promised Land", piano on "Help Me" and "Love Song of the Year"
- Ronnie Tutt – drums
- JD Sumner & The Stamps (Bill Baize, Ed Enoch, David Rowland) – backing vocals
- Jeannie Greene – backing vocals
- Mary and Ginger Holladay – backing vocals
- Susan Pilkington – backing vocals
- Voice (Donnie Sumner, Sherrill Nielsen, Tim Baty, Per Eric "Pete" Hallin) – backing vocals
- Kathy Westmoreland – backing vocals

Overdubbed

- Dennis Linde, Alan Rush – guitar on "Promised Land"
- Bobby Ogdin – piano on "Promised Land"
- Randy Cullers – cowbell on "Promised Land"
- Mike Leech – string and brass arrangements
- Bobby Taylor – oboe

Technical

- Felton Jarvis – producer
- Mike Moran, Dick Baxter, Al Pachucki, Mickey Crofford – engineers

== Charts ==
=== Weekly charts ===
Chart (1975)	Peak position
US Billboard 200	47
US Top Country Albums (Billboard)	1

=== Year-end charts ===
Chart (1975)	Position
US Top Country Albums (Billboard)	31
