= Isabella Flores =

American ice dancer (born 2003)

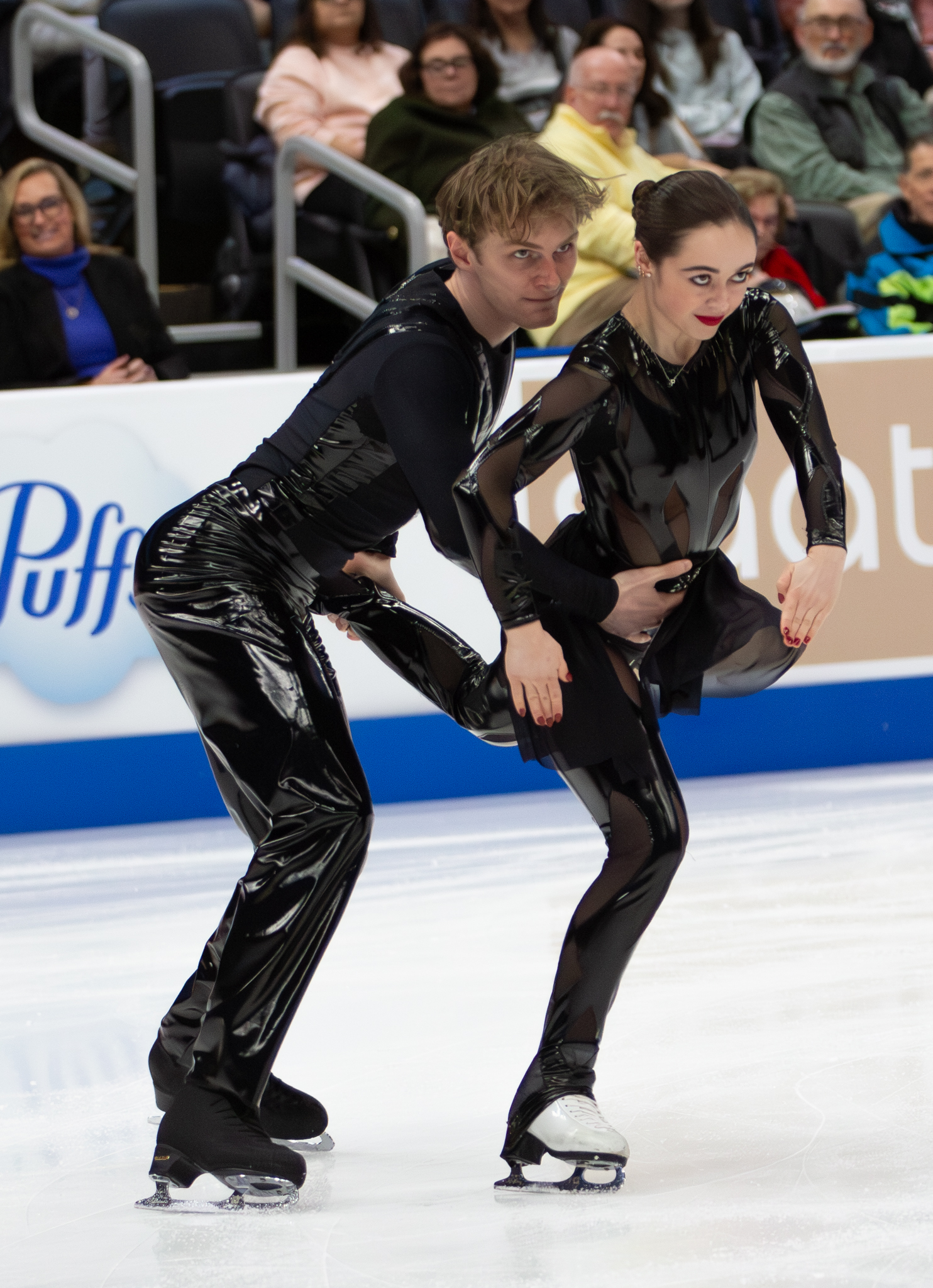
- Isabella Flores and Linus Colmor Jepsen at the 2026 U.S. Championships

Personal information
- Full name: Isabella Hope Flores
- Other names: Bella
- Born: April 30, 2003 (age 23) Wiesbaden, Germany
- Home town: Colorado Springs, Colorado, U.S.
- Height: 5 ft 0 in (1.53 m)

Figure skating career
- Country: United States
- Discipline: Ice dance
- Partner: Linus Colmor Jepsen (since 2025); Ivan Desyatov (2022–25); Dimitry Tsarevski (2020–21); Adam Bouaziz (2019–20)
- Coach: Scott Moir; Madison Hubbell; Adrián Díaz; Cara Moir
- Skating club: Ice Dance Academy of Montreal
- Began skating: 2009

Isabella "Bella" Hope Flores (born April 30, 2003) is an American ice dancer. With her former skating partner and husband, Ivan Desyatov, she is the 2023 Golden Spin of Zagreb bronze medalist.

With her former skating partner, Dimitry Tsarevski, she is the 2021 JGP France II silver medalist, the 2021 JGP Poland silver medalist, and the 2021 U.S. junior national pewter medalist.

== Personal life ==
Flores was born on April 30, 2003, in Wiesbaden, Germany to parents Holly, a financial advisor, and Tony, a consultant, both of whom served in the U.S. Army. She has a younger sister, Olivia, who competes for the U.S. in pair skating. Flores is of Mexican and Italian descent.

Flores graduated with honors from Cheyenne Mountain High School in 2021, where she ran varsity cross-country in addition to her ice dance training. As of 2023, she is a student at the University of Colorado Colorado Springs majoring in mathematics.

She married her ice dance partner, Ivan Desyatov, on August 12, 2022, in El Paso County, Colorado.

== Career ==
=== Early years ===
Flores began learning how to skate in 2009 in Colorado Springs. She trained as a single skater in 2011, when she became inspired to take up ice dance after attending a seminar on the discipline hosted by her current coach, Elena Dostatni. Early in her ice dance career, Flores skated with a number of different partners, including Davis Ortonward from 2013 to 2014, Mikhail Gumba from 2017 to 2018, and British skater Adam Bouaziz from 2019 to 2020. Flores/Bouaziz finished 13th at the 2020 U.S. Junior Championships before splitting in the spring when Bouaziz returned home to the United Kingdom.

Following the end of her partnership with Bouaziz, Flores teamed up with Dimitry Tsarevski in May 2020. Due to the COVID-19 pandemic, Flores/Tsarevski only competed domestically during the 2020–21 season, placing third in the junior ice dance category at a U.S. Figure Skating virtual invitational event and claiming the pewter medal at the 2021 U.S. Junior Championships. Following their podium finish at nationals, Flores stated, "Dima and I are ecstatic that we were able to make the breakthrough." The then-17-year-old also shared hopes for the season ahead, adding, "Ultimately this [their 4th place finish] allows us to set loftier goals for this season such as qualifying for Junior Worlds."

=== Partnership with Tsarevski ===
==== 2021–22 season: International junior debut and two Junior Grand Prix medals ====
Flores/Tsarevski received two ISU Junior Grand Prix series assignments in their international debut season as team. They placed second at both of their events, the 2021 JGP France II and the 2021 JGP Poland, and were named as second alternates for the ultimately cancelled 2021–22 Junior Grand Prix Final. The duo competed once more ahead of the 2022 U.S. Figure Skating Championships, taking the junior ice dance title at another domestic invitational event in November.

Flores/Tsarevski were slated to competed at the U.S. national championships in early January 2022. However, Flores unexpectedly lost contact with Tsarevski in late December 2021, citing Christmas Day as the last time she'd been able to reach him. In a final update on the situation posted to her Instagram account on February 3, 2022, Flores stated that while she still had not heard from Tsarevski, she'd decided to accept the apparent end of their partnership and begin considering other options to continue her ice dance career. While further details regarding Tsarevski's circumstances during late 2021 and early 2022 have never been made public, the skater did return to competition in 2023 with a new partner, Katarina Wolfkostin.

=== Partnership with Desyatov ===
==== 2022–23 season: Debut of Flores/Desyatov ====
Flores traveled abroad for two months at the beginning of 2022 in search of a new partner, but ultimately, her efforts were unsuccessful. She returned to her home rink in Colorado where she met her future partner, Ivan Desyatov, who'd made the decision to relocate to the United States from Belarus in search of a partner of his own during the time she'd been away. The two skaters tried out and skated together for several months before officially committing to a partnership, having both recently gone through major periods of transition. Flores/Desyatov confirmed their partnership for the U.S. in June 2022.

Flores/Desyatov were initially unable to compete internationally for the U.S. as Desyatov was still awaiting release from the Skating Union of Belarus. They qualified to the 2023 U.S. Figure Skating Championships by placing second in the senior ice dance category at the 2023 Eastern Sectional Championships. Flores/Desyatov finished 10th at the U.S. Championships in late January 2023.

Negotiations for Desyatov's release from Belarus began at the end of the 2022–23 season. The process proved more complicated and financially burdensome than the team initially expected, as the Belarusian federation requested US$25,000 in restitution for Desyatov's training expenses incurred during the season prior. Flores and Desyatov were able to crowdfund the majority of the cost requested, and Flores announced their success in securing Desyatov's release on July 16, 2023.

==== 2023–24 season ====
Flores/Desyatov opened their season late, debuting on the ISU Challenger Series at the 2023 CS Golden Spin of Zagreb in early December. They placed third in the rhythm dance and climbed to second in the free dance, ultimately finishing third overall behind Lithuanian champions Allison Reed / Saulius Ambrulevičius and American compatriots Emilea Zingas / Vadym Kolesnik. The pair also competed in the 2024 U.S. Figure Skating Championships where they finished seventh and received a standing ovation for their free dance.

==== 2024–25 season: Suspension of Desyatov ====
Flores/Desyatov began their season by finishing fifth at the 2024 Lake Placid Ice Dance International and sixth at the 2024 CS Denis Ten Memorial Challenge.

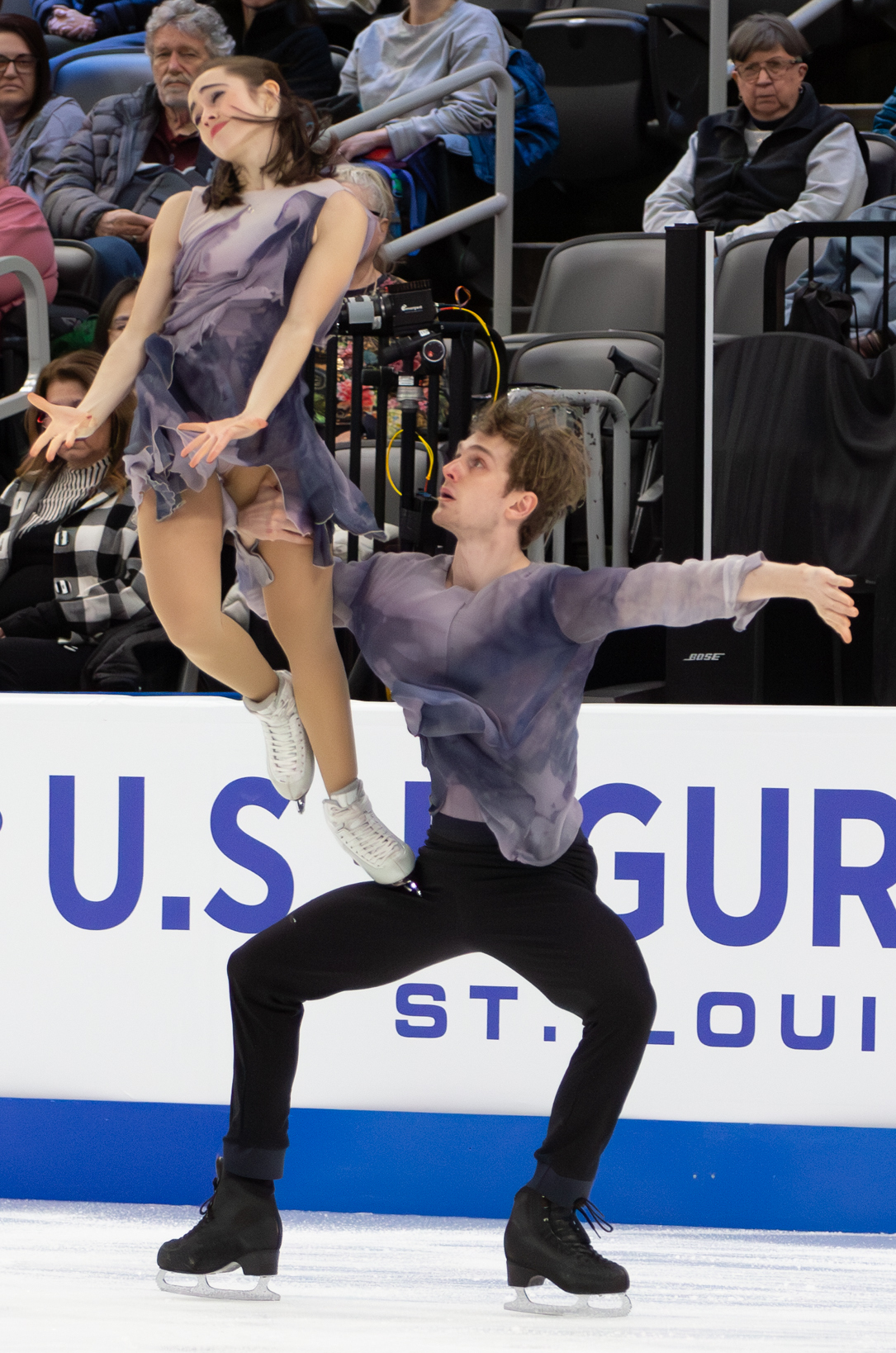
Flores and Jepsen performing a lift during their free dance at the 2026 U.S. Championships

The duo were assigned to debut on the 2024–25 Grand Prix circuit at the 2024 Skate America, however, two days before the event, their names were withdrawn and they were replaced by Annabelle Morozov/Jeffrey Chen. On October 18, the U.S. Center for SafeSport announced that Desyatov had been sanctioned with a temporary suspension due to allegations of misconduct. In November, Flores made an Instagram post, confirming that she and Desyatov would miss the remainder of the season due to the ongoing investigation.

=== Partnership with Jepsen ===
==== 2025–26 season ====
In July 2025, Flores shared on her Instagram that she and Desyatov had parted ways and that she had teamed up with Danish ice dancer, Linus Colmor Jepsen. It was subsequently announced that she and Jepsen would train in Lyon, France under coaches Muriel Zazoui, Marien de la Asuncion, Emi Hirai, and Olivier Schoenfelder and represent the United States.

The team debuted in November at the 2025 CS Warsaw Cup, where they came in sixteenth place. They then went on to finish fifth at the 2025 Santa Claus Cup.

In January, Flores/Jepsen competed at the 2026 U.S. Championships, where they finished in fourteenth place.

In May, it was announced that Flores/Jepsen had relocated to London, Ontario, Canada to train under Scott Moir, Madison Hubbell, Adrián Díaz, and Cara Moir.

== Programs ==
=== Ice dance with Linus Colmor Jepsen ===
Season	Rhythm dance	Free dance
2026–2027	Totentanz by Franz Liszt; Danse Macabre by Camille Saint-Saëns choreo. by Adrián Díaz	
2025–2026	Intergalactic by Beastie Boys; Firestarter by The Prodigy	Movies by Weyes Blood

=== Ice dance with Ivan Desyatov ===
Season	Rhythm dance	Free dance
2024–2025	You Never Can Tell by Chuck Berry; Jungle Boogie by Kool & the Gang; Great Balls of Fire by Jerry Lee Lewis choreo. by Kaitlyn Weaver, Elena Dostatni	Poor Things by Jerskin Fendrix choreo. by Kaitlyn Weaver, Elena Dostatni
2023–2024	Pour Some Sugar on Me by Def Leppard; When Doves Cry by Prince choreo. by Massimo Scali	I Feel Pretty; Maria; Tonight (from West Side Story) by Leonard Bernstein, Stephen Sondheim choreo. by Kaitlyn Weaver
2022–2023	El Tiburón by Proyecto Uno; '03 Bonnie & Clyde by Jay-Z, feat. Beyoncé choreo. by Elena Dostatni	I Love You – Acoustic by Woodkid; Solas by Jamie Duffy choreo. by Massimo Scali

=== Ice dance with Dimitry Tsarevski ===
Season	Rhythm dance	Free dance
2021–2022	Blues: Oh, What a Night for Dancing by Barry White; Funk: Perm by Bruno Mars choreo. by Joel Dear	Nuvole Bianche by Ludovico Einaudi; Earth Song by Michael Jackson choreo. by Joel Dear
2020–2021	I'd Rather Be Blue; Don't Rain on My Parade (from Funny Girl) performed by Barbra Streisand choreo. by Christopher Dean	Tangomania by Aldo Maietti e la sua Orchestra; Oblivion by Astor Piazzolla performed by Gidon Kremer choreo. by Christopher Dean

== Competitive highlights ==
- JGP – Event of the ISU Junior Grand Prix Series
- CS – Event of the ISU Challenger Series
- WD – Withdrew from competition

=== Ice dance with Linus Colmor Jepsen ===
Competition placements at senior level
Season	2025–26	2026–27
U.S. Championships	14th	
CS Denis Ten Memorial		9th
CS Warsaw Cup	16th	TBD
Santa Claus Cup	5th	

=== Ice dance with Ivan Desyatov ===
Competition placements at senior level
Season	2022–23	2023–24	2024–25
U.S. Championships	10th	7th	
CS Denis Ten Memorial			6th
CS Golden Spin of Zagreb		3rd	
Egna Dance Trophy		2nd	
Lake Placid Ice Dance			5th

=== Ice dance with Dimitry Tsarevski ===
International: Junior
Event	2020–21	2021–22
JGP France II		2nd
JGP Poland		2nd
Lake Placid IDI		1st
National
U.S. Champ	4th J	WD

=== With Bouaziz ===
National
Event	2019–20
U.S. Champ.	13th J
U.S. Ice Dance Final	13th J
Levels: J = Junior

== Detailed results ==
=== Ice dance with Linus Colmor Jepsen ===
ISU personal best scores in the +5/-5 GOE System
Segment	Type	Score	Event
Total	TSS	161.48	2025 CS Warsaw Cup
Short program	TSS	67.71	2025 CS Warsaw Cup
Short program	TES	38.91	2025 CS Warsaw Cup
Short program	PCS	28.80	2025 CS Warsaw Cup
Free skating	TSS	93.77	2025 CS Warsaw Cup
Free skating	TES	50.17	2025 CS Warsaw Cup
Free skating	PCS	43.60	2025 CS Warsaw Cup

Results in the 2025–26 season
Date	Event	RD		FD		Total	
Date	Event	P	Score	P	Score	P	Score
Nov 19–23, 2025	(Poland) 2025 CS Warsaw Cup	10	67.71	19	93.77	16	161.48
Nov 26–30, 2025	(Hungary) 2025 Santa Claus Cup	5	66.36	6	97.22	5	163.58
Jan 4–11, 2026	(United States) 2026 U.S. Championships	13	66.37	15	94.38	14	160.75

Results in the 2026–27 season
Date	Event	RD		FD		Total	
Date	Event	P	Score	P	Score	P	Score
Oct 7–11, 2026	(Kazakhstan) 2026 CS Denis Ten Memorial Challenge	8	60.76	9	88.92	9	149.68
Nov 25–29, 2026	(Poland) 2026 CS Warsaw Cup						

=== Ice dance with Ivan Desyatov ===
ISU personal best scores in the +5/-5 GOE System
Segment	Type	Score	Event
Total	TSS	180.62	2023 CS Golden Spin of Zagreb
Short program	TSS	72.47	2023 CS Golden Spin of Zagreb
Short program	TES	40.88	2023 CS Golden Spin of Zagreb
Short program	PCS	31.59	2023 CS Golden Spin of Zagreb
Free skating	TSS	108.69	2024 CS Denis Ten Memorial Challenge
Free skating	TES	61.89	2024 CS Denis Ten Memorial Challenge
Free skating	PCS	48.30	2023 CS Golden Spin of Zagreb

Results in the 2024–25 season
Date	Event	RD		FD		Total	
Date	Event	P	Score	P	Score	P	Score
Jul 30–31, 2024	(United States) 2024 Lake Placid Ice Dance International	5	67.85	6	108.60	5	176.45
Oct 2–5, 2024	(Kazakhstan) 2024 CS Denis Ten Memorial Challenge	6	65.63	4	108.69	6	174.32
