= The Gospel Road =

The Gospel Road: A Story of Jesus

Soundtrack album by Johnny Cash
- Released: April 2, 1973
- Recorded: 1971
- Genre: Gospel
- Label: Columbia
- Producer: Larry Butler

Johnny Cash chronology
Any Old Wind that Blows (1973)	The Gospel Road: A Story of Jesus (1973)	Johnny Cash and His Woman (1973)

Singles from The Gospel Road
- 1. "Children" Released: January 26, 1973

The Gospel Road: A Story of Jesus is a double album and the fourth gospel album and 45th overall album by American country singer Johnny Cash, released on CBS Records in 1973. It is the soundtrack to the film of the same name released by Twentieth Century Fox.

The movie and the soundtrack tell the story of the life of Jesus. The album consists primarily of spoken-word recordings taken from the film of Cash describing the action on screen, interspersed with occasional songs, including several that are presented in piecemeal form through the album. Additional vocalists featured on varying tracks include The Carter Family, The Statler Brothers, June Carter Cash (who in the film and on the album portrays Mary Magdalene), Larry Gatlin, Kris Kristofferson, and Rita Coolidge. Songs performed included several that Cash had previously recorded for records such as The Holy Land and Hello, I'm Johnny Cash ("He Turned the Water Into Wine" and "Jesus Was a Carpenter", respectively), along with cover versions of the Larry Gatlin song "Help Me" (which is titled simply "Help" on this release) and "Follow Me" by John Denver. Cash later recorded a full version of "Help Me" which was included on the posthumous album American V: A Hundred Highways under its complete title.

It peaked at No. 12 on the country album charts; the single released from it was "Children" / "Last Supper" (Columbia SP 4-45786, March, 1973). The movie was released on March 31, 1973.

== Track listing ==
=== Side one ===
Running time - 22:36

1. Song: "Praise the Lord" - Johnny Cash (Johnny Cash)
2. Introduction*
3. Song: "Gospel Road (Part 1)" - Johnny Cash (Christopher Wren)
4. Jesus Early Years*
5. Song: "Gospel Road (Part 2)" - Johnny Cash (Christopher Wren)
6. John the Baptist*
7. Baptism Of Jesus*
8. Wilderness Temptation*
9. Follow Me, Jesus*
10. Song: "Gospel Road (Part 3)" - Johnny Cash (Christopher Wren)
11. Jesus Announces His Divinity*
12. Jesus' Opposition is Established*
13. Jesus' First Miracle*
14. Song: "He Turned the Water into Wine (Part 1)" - Johnny Cash (Johnny Cash)
15. State of the Nation*
16. Song: "I See Men as Trees Walking" - Johnny Cash with The Carter Family and The Statler Brothers (Johnny Cash)
17. Song: "Jesus Was a Carpenter" - Johnny Cash (Christopher Wren)
18. Choosing of Twelve Disciples*

=== Side two ===
Running time - 22:00

1. Jesus's Teachings *
2. Parable of the Good Shepherd *
3. The Two Greatest Commandments *
4. Greater Love Hath No Man *
5. John the Baptist's Imprisonment and Death *
6. Jesus Cleanses the Temple *
7. Jesus Upbraids Scribes and Pharisees *
8. Jesus in the Temple *
9. Come Unto Me *
10. Adulterous Woman, The *
11. Song: "Help (Part #1)" - Larry Gatlin, Kris Kristofferson and Rita Coolidge (Larry Gatlin)
12. Jesus and Nicodemus*
13. Song: "Help (Part #2)" - Kris Kristofferson and Rita Coolidge (Larry Gatlin)
14. Sermon on the Mount *
15. Blessed Are *
16. The Lord's Prayer *
17. Song: "Amen Chorus (Part 1)" - The Carter Family and the Statler Brothers (Traditional)
18. Introducing Mary Magdalene *
19. Mary Magdalene Speaks *
20. Song: "Follow Me" - June Carter (John Denver)
21. Magdalene Speaks Again *

=== Side three ===
Running time - 24:47

1. Crossing the Sea of Galilee *
2. Song: "He Turned the Water into Wine (Part 2)" - Johnny Cash (Johnny Cash)
3. Song: "He Turned the Water into Wine (Part 3)" - Johnny Cash (Johnny Cash)
4. Feeding the Multitude *
5. Song: "He Turned the Water into Wine (Part 4)" - Johnny Cash (Johnny Cash)
6. More Jesus Teachings *
7. Living Water and the Bread of Life, The *
8. Gospel Road (Part 4) - Johnny Cash (Christopher Wren)
9. Jesus and Children *
10. Song: "Children" - Johnny Cash with The Carter Family (Joe South)
11. Four Months to Live *
12. Song: "Help (Part 3)" - Johnny Cash (Larry Gatlin)
13. Song: "Help (Part 4)" - Johnny Cash (Larry Gatlin)
14. Raising of Lazarus *
15. Jesus' Second Coming *
16. Jesus' Entry into Jerusalem *
17. Song: "The Burden of Freedom (Part 1)" - Johnny Cash (Kris Kristofferson)
18. Jesus Wept*
19. Song: "The Burden of Freedom (Part 2)" - Johnny Cash (Kris Kristofferson)
20. Jesus Cleanses Temple Again *

=== Side four ===
Running time - 21:22

1. Feast of the Passover *
2. Song: "Lord, Is It I?" - The Statler Brothers (Harold Reid/DonReid, of The Statler Brothers)
3. Song: "The Last Supper" - Johnny Cash with The Statler Brothers (Kris Kristofferson)
4. John 14:1-3 *
5. And Now, He's Alone *
6. Agony in Gethsemane *
7. Jesus Before Caiaphas, Pilate and Herod *
8. Song: "The Burden of Freedom (Part 3)" - Johnny Cash (Kris Kristofferson)
9. Crucifixion *
10. Jesus' Last Words *
11. Jesus' Death *
12. Earthquake and Darkness *
13. He is Risen *
14. Mary Magdalene Returns to Galilee *
15. Jesus Appears to Disciples *
16. Great Commission, The *
17. Ascension *
18. Song: "Amen Chorus (Part 2)" - The Carter Family and the Statler Brothers (Traditional)
19. Jesus Was a Carpenter (Part 2) - Johnny Cash (Christopher Wren)

Tracks* narration by Johnny Cash, recorded in The Holy Land. Written by Johnny Cash and L Murray.

== Personnel ==
- Johnny Cash - narrator, vocals, guitar
- Bob Wootton, Carl Perkins, Ray Edenton, Bill Rice, Red Lane, Billy Sanford, Larry Gatlin, Jim Colvard, Chip Young - guitar
- Marshall Grant, Tommy Cogbill - bass
- WS Holland, Kenny Buttrey - drums
- Norman Blake - dobro
- Bill Pursell, Charles Cochran, Bobby Wood - piano
- Larry Butler, Mike Utley - keyboards
- Don Tweedy - saxophone
- Farrell Morris - percussion
- Bill Justis, Charles Cochran, Don Tweedy - arrangements

Technical

- Charlie Bragg, Freeman Ramsey, Roger Tucker, Selby Coffeen - engineer
- Bill Barnes, Peggy Owen - album design

== Charts ==
Album - Billboard (United States)

Year	Chart	Position
1973	Pop Albums	205
1973	Country Albums	12
