= Love Affairs =

Love Affairs may refer to:

- Love Affairs (song), a 1983 song by Michael Martin Murphey
- Love Affair(s), a 2020 French drama film
- Love Affairs (1927 film), a German silent film

== See also ==
- Love Affair (disambiguation)
