= Ivan Desyatov =

Russian-American ice dancer (born 2001)

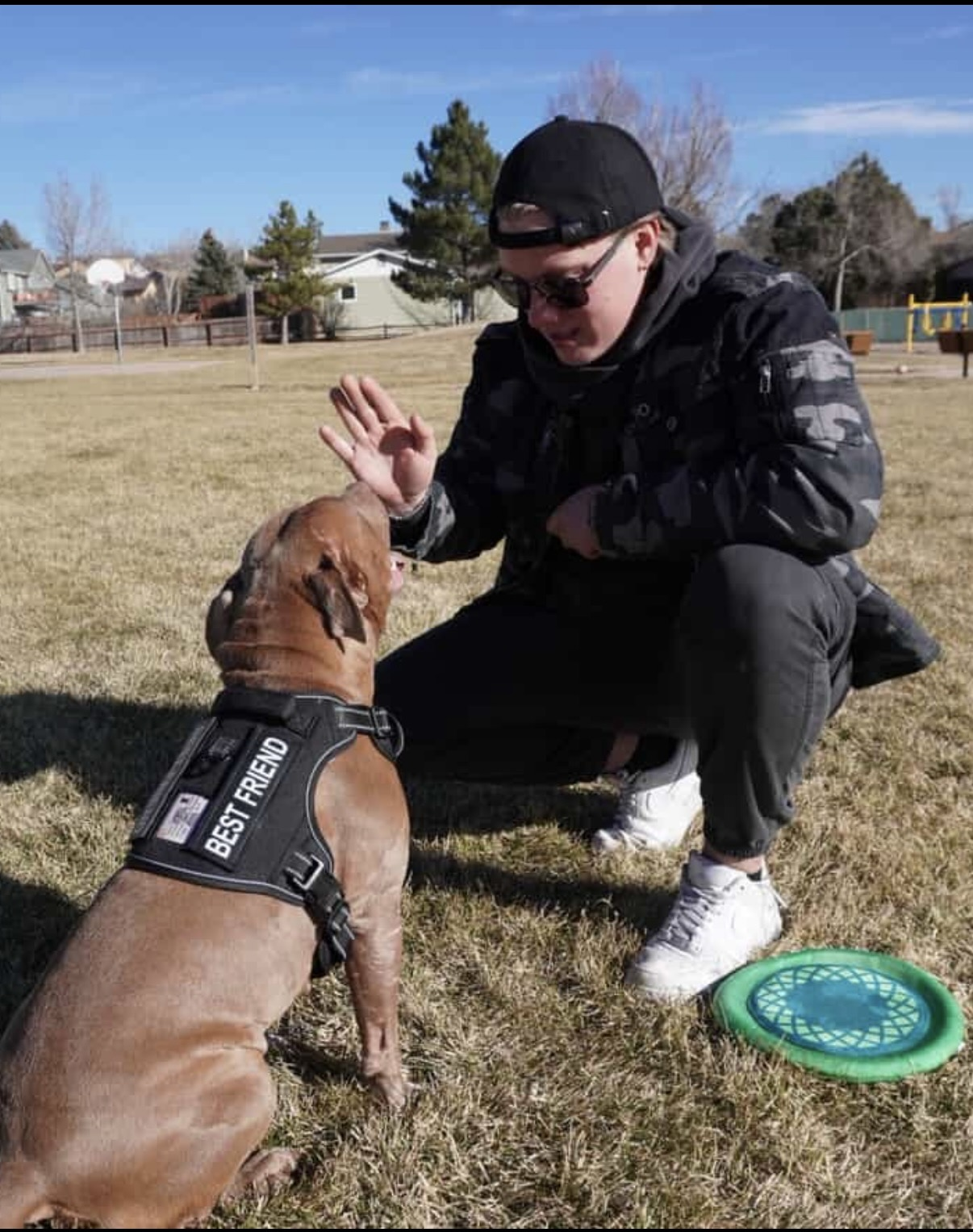
- Ivan Desyatov and his dog in 2026

Personal information
- Native name: Иван Евгеньевич Десятов
- Full name: Ivan Evgenyevich Desyatov
- Born: February 6, 2001 (age 25) Moscow, Russia
- Home town: Colorado Springs, Colorado, United States
- Height: 1.75 m (5 ft 9 in)

Figure skating career
- Country: United States (since 2022); Belarus (2021–22); Russia (2012–21)
- Discipline: Ice dance
- Partner: Isabella Flores (2022-25); Ekaterina Andreeva (2014–22); Irina Khavronina (2012–14)
- Coach: Elena Dostatni; Leifur Gislason
- Began skating: 2005
- Retired: 2025

Ivan "Vanya" Evgenyevich Desyatov (Russian: Иван Евгеньевич Десятов; born February 6, 2001) is a former Russian-American ice dancer. With his wife and former skating partner, Isabella Flores, he is the 2023 Golden Spin of Zagreb bronze medalist.

== Personal life ==
Desyatov was born on February 6, 2001, in Moscow, Russia. His parents died when he was a young teenager, survived by Desyatov and his brother, Valentin. He graduated from high school in Odintsovo, Russia in 2019.

He married his ice dance partner, Isabella Flores, on August 12, 2022 in El Paso County, Colorado.

== Career ==
=== Early years ===
Desyatov began learning how to skate in 2005 at age four. He was scouted at a public rink in Moscow by his first coach, who encouraged his mother to put him in figure skating. He later began training as an ice dancer at the age of 11, coached by Alexei Gorshkov. Desyatov's early skating partners included Anna Bogomolova and Irina Khavronina, with whom he competed at the novice level. He teamed up with long-time partner Ekaterina Andreeva in 2014, and together they competed at the novice and junior levels for Russia until the end of 2021. Andreeva/Desyatov received a handful of junior international assignments during their seven-year career for Russia, including the 2018 JGP Lithuania where they finished fifth. They also earned podium placements at the 2017 and 2018 Golden Spin of Zagreb and the 2018 Ice Star.

=== 2021–22 season ===
Andreeva/Desyatov petitioned the Russian Figure Skating Federation for release to represent Belarus, and their request was granted in advance of the 2021–22 season. The team made their debut for Belarus at the 2021 JGP France II where they finished 5th. They followed this performance up with a 7th-place finish at the 2021 JGP Poland and were slated to next compete in the junior ice dance event at the 2021 Denis Ten Memorial Challenge but withdrew ahead of the competition. They concluded their season at the 2022 Belarusian Figure Skating Championships, where they won the junior dance title.

=== 2022–23 season: Debut of Flores/Desyatov ===
The 2022 Russian invasion of Ukraine prompted the International Skating Union to exclude athletes representing Russia and Belarus from international competition indefinitely as of March 1, 2022, effectively halting Andreeva/Desyatov's career. The team split after eight years together and, encouraged by his older brother, Desyatov left Belarus, flying to the United States in April with only a loose plan for his future there in place. He ended up in Colorado Springs, Colorado at the Thunderbirds Figure Skating Club, training under former Russian ice dancer Elena Dostatni. There he met his current skating partner, Isabella Flores, who had recently returned home after several months abroad in search of a new partnership. The two skaters tried out and skated together for several months before officially committing to competing together, having both recently gone through major periods of transition. Flores/Desyatov confirmed their partnership for the U.S. in June 2022.

Flores/Desyatov were initially unable to compete internationally for the U.S. as Desyatov was still awaiting release from the Skating Union of Belarus. They qualified to the 2023 U.S. Figure Skating Championships by placing second in the senior ice dance category at the 2023 Eastern Sectional Championships. Flores/Desyatov finished 10th at the U.S. Championships in late January 2023.

Negotiations for Desyatov's release from Belarus began at the end of the 2022–23 season. The process proved more complicated and financially burdensome than the team initially expected, as the Belarusian federation requested US$25,000 in restitution for Desyatov's training expenses incurred during the season prior. Flores and Desyatov were able to crowdfund the majority of the cost requested, and Flores announced their success in securing Desyatov's release on July 16, 2023.

=== 2023–24 season ===
Flores/Desyatov opened their season late, debuting on the ISU Challenger Series at the 2023 CS Golden Spin of Zagreb in early December. They placed third in the rhythm dance and climbed to second in the free dance, ultimately finishing third overall behind Lithuanian champions Allison Reed / Saulius Ambrulevičius and American compatriots Emilea Zingas / Vadym Kolesnik. The pair also competed in the 2024 U.S. Figure Skating Championships where they finished seventh and received a standing ovation for their free dance.

=== 2024–25 season: Allegations of misconduct and suspension ===
Flores and Desyatov began their season by finishing fifth at the 2024 Lake Placid Ice Dance International and sixth at the 2024 Denis Ten Memorial Challenge.

The duo was assigned to debut on the 2024–25 Grand Prix circuit at the 2024 Skate America; however, two days before the event, their names were withdrawn, and they were replaced by Annabelle Morozov and Jeffrey Chen.

On October 18, the U.S. Center for SafeSport announced that Desyatov had been sanctioned with a temporary suspension due to an ongoing investigation of misconduct allegations. In November 2024, French-Estonian ice dancer Solène Mazingue came forward, publicly identifying herself as the individual that filed the complaint to SafeSport.

Desyatov’s U.S. Center for SafeSport Centralized Disciplinary Database entry was changed from “Permanent Ineligibility” to “Suspension,” with the current CDD entry dated December 19, 2025. The database uses separate action labels for “Suspension” and “Permanent Ineligibility.” U.S. Figure Skating materials continues to list or categorize him under “Permanent Ineligibility and does not reflect the change in status as yet. ”

== Programs ==
=== With Flores ===
Season	Short program	Free skating
2024–2025	You Never Can Tell by Chuck Berry; Jungle Boogie by Kool & the Gang; Great Balls of Fire by Jerry Lee Lewis choreo. by Kaitlyn Weaver, Elena Dostatni	Poor Things by Jerskin Fendrix choreo. by Kaitlyn Weaver, Elena Dostatni
2023–2024	Pour Some Sugar on Me by Def Leppard; When Doves Cry by Prince choreo. by Massimo Scali, Elena Dostatni	I Feel Pretty; Maria; Tonight (from West Side Story) by Leonard Bernstein, Stephen Sondheim choreo. by Massimo Scali, Elena Dostatni
2022–2023	El Tiburón by Proyecto Uno; '03 Bonnie & Clyde by Jay-Z, feat. Beyoncé	I Love You - Acoustic by Woodkid; Solas by Jamie Duffy

=== With Andreeva ===
Season	Short program	Free skating
2021–2022	Mount Everest by Labrinth; I Am the Best by 2NE1 choreo. by Artem Khromykh	Heaven I Know by Gordi; In This Shirt by The Irrepressibles; Brim by Ólafur Arnalds choreo. by Artem Khromykh
2019–2020	Blues: Mungojerrie and Rumpleteazer; Foxtrot: Macavity: The Mystery Cat; Quickstep: The Old Gumbie Cat (from Cats) by Andrew Lloyd Webber	Shahmaran by Sevdaliza; No Twerk by Apashe

== Competitive highlights ==
- JGP – Event of the ISU Junior Grand Prix Series
- CS – Event of the ISU Challenger Series
- WD – Withdrew from competition

=== Ice dance with Isabella Flores (for the United States) ===
Competition placements at senior level
Season	2022–23	2023–24	2024–25
U.S. Championships	10th	7th	
CS Denis Ten Memorial			6th
CS Golden Spin of Zagreb		3rd	
Egna Dance Trophy		2nd	
Lake Placid Ice Dance			5th

=== Ice dance with Ekaterina Andreeva (for Belarus) ===
Competition placements at junior level
Season	2021–22
Belarusian Championships	1st
JGP France	5th
JGP Poland	7th
Denis Ten Memorial	WD

=== Ice dance with Ekaterina Andreeva (for Russia) ===
Competition placements at junior level
Season	2016–17	2017–18	2018–19	2020–21
Russian Championships	WD	8th	6th	4th
JGP Lithuania			5th	
Golden Spin of Zagreb		3rd	2nd	
Ice Star			2nd	
Volvo Open Cup			6th	

== Detailed results ==
=== Ice dance with Isabella Flores (for the United States) ===
ISU personal best scores in the +5/-5 GOE System
Segment	Type	Score	Event
Total	TSS	180.62	2023 CS Golden Spin of Zagreb
Short program	TSS	72.47	2023 CS Golden Spin of Zagreb
Short program	TES	40.88	2023 CS Golden Spin of Zagreb
Short program	PCS	31.59	2023 CS Golden Spin of Zagreb
Free skating	TSS	108.69	2024 CS Denis Ten Memorial Challenge
Free skating	TES	61.89	2024 CS Denis Ten Memorial Challenge
Free skating	PCS	48.30	2023 CS Golden Spin of Zagreb

Results in the 2024–25 season
Date	Event	RD		FD		Total	
Date	Event	P	Score	P	Score	P	Score
Jul 30–31, 2024	(United States) 2024 Lake Placid Ice Dance International	5	67.85	6	108.60	5	176.45
Oct 2–5, 2024	(Kazakhstan) 2024 CS Denis Ten Memorial Challenge	6	65.63	4	108.69	6	174.32
