= It's Midnight =

Single by Elvis Presley

from the album Promised Land
- B-side: "Promised Land"
- Released: September 27, 1974
- Recorded: December 10, 1973
- Studio: Stax Studios, Memphis
- Genre: Country
- Length: 3:20
- Label: RCA Victor
- Songwriters: Billy Edd Wheeler and Jerry Chesnut
- Producer: Felton Jarvis

Elvis Presley singles chronology
"If You Talk in Your Sleep" / "Help Me" (1974)	"It's Midnight" / "Promised Land" (1974)	"My Boy" / "Thinking About You" (1975)

"It's Midnight" is a 1974 song recorded by Elvis Presley. It was written by Jerry Chesnut and Billy Edd Wheeler.

== Recording ==
Elvis Presley recorded it during his December 10–16, 1973, recording sessions at Stax Records in Memphis. The session produced three more charting songs: "Promised Land", "If You Talk in Your Sleep" and "Help Me".

== Release history ==
The song was first released in October 1974 as a B-side to a cover of Chuck Berry's "Promised Land". (While the Goldmine Standard Catalog of American Records indicates "Promised Land" as the A-side, different pressings have "It's Midnight" as the A-side and "Promised Land" as a B-side and vice versa.)

== Reception ==
"Promised Land" rose to number 14 on the Billboard Hot 100, while the two sides together (as "It's Midnight / Promised Land") and "It's Midnight" on its own charted on the Hot Country Singles chart. "It's Midnight" peaked on it at number 9 in January 1975.

== Critical reception ==
Billboard in its review of the album Promised Land (in the January 18, 1975 issue) picked "It's Midnight" as one of the best cuts on the album.

== Charts ==
Chart (1974–1975)	Peak position
US Billboard Easy Listening	8*
US Billboard Hot Country Singles	14* / 9**

^{*} as "It's Midnight / Promised Land"
^{**} as "It's Midnight"
