= American V: A Hundred Highways =

Studio album by Johnny Cash
- Released: July 4, 2006
- Recorded: May–August 2003
- Studio: Cash Cabin Studio (Hendersonville, Tennessee); Akadamie Mathematique of Philosophical Sound Research (Los Angeles, California) Sound City (Van Nuys)
- Length: 42:45
- Label: American
- Producer: Rick Rubin

Johnny Cash chronology
Personal File (2006)	American V: A Hundred Highways (2006)	The Legend of Johnny Cash Vol. II (2006)

American series chronology
Unearthed (2003)	American V: A Hundred Highways (2006)	American VI: Ain't No Grave (2010)

Singles from American V: A Hundred Highways
- 1. "God's Gonna Cut You Down" Released: July 3, 2006; 2. "Help Me" Released: November 1, 2006

Professional ratings
Aggregate scores
Source	Rating
Metacritic	82/100
Review scores
Source	Rating
AllMusic	4/5 stars
Entertainment Weekly	A−
The Guardian	5/5 stars
Mojo	3.5/5 stars
NME	9/10
Now	5/5
Pitchfork	7.8/10
Q	4/5 stars
Rolling Stone	4/5 stars
Slant Magazine	5/5 stars

American V: A Hundred Highways is a posthumously released studio album by American singer-songwriter Johnny Cash. It was released on July 4, 2006, by American Recordings. As the title implies, it is the fifth entry in Cash's American series. Like its predecessors, the album is produced by Rick Rubin. It was Cash's first No. 1 album in 37 years. It was certified Gold on August 18, 2006, by the RIAA.

== Background ==
As with the other albums in the American series, the album includes covers and originals. The originals on this album are "I Came to Believe" and "Like the 309", the latter of which was the last song Cash wrote before his death in 2003. Recorded on August 21, 2003, "Like the 309" was the next-to-last song Cash ever recorded; the last being "Engine One-Forty-Three" which was produced by John Carter Cash and released on the 2004 compilation album The Unbroken Circle: The Musical Heritage of the Carter Family. The album takes its name from a lyric on the track "Love's Been Good to Me" by Rod McKuen.

=== Previous recordings ===
Three songs on the album are updated versions of songs previously recorded by Cash.

- "Help Me" was previously recorded by Cash for his 1973 album "The Gospel Road".
- "I Came to Believe" was previously recorded by Cash in the 1980s during the recording sessions that would ultimately result in the posthumous 2014 release Out Among the Stars.
- "I'm Free from the Chain Gang Now" was previously recorded by Cash for his 1962 album The Sound of Johnny Cash.

== Chart performance ==
American V: A Hundred Highways peaked at No. 1 on the US Billboard 200 with 88,000 copies sold in the United States, according to Nielsen SoundScan. It was Cash's first No. 1 album since 1969's Johnny Cash at San Quentin.

== Track listing ==
No.	Title	Writer(s)	Length
1.	"Help Me"	Larry Gatlin	2:51
2.	"God's Gonna Cut You Down"	Traditional	2:38
3.	"Like the 309"	Johnny Cash	4:35
4.	"If You Could Read My Mind"	Gordon Lightfoot	4:30
5.	"Further on Up the Road"	Bruce Springsteen	3:25
6.	"On the Evening Train"	Hank Williams	4:17
7.	"I Came to Believe"	Johnny Cash	3:44
8.	"Love's Been Good to Me"	Rod McKuen	3:18
9.	"A Legend in My Time"	Don Gibson	2:37
10.	"Rose of My Heart"	Hugh Moffatt	3:18
11.	"Four Strong Winds"	Ian Tyson	4:34
12.	"I'm Free from the Chain Gang Now"	Lou Herscher, Saul Klein	3:00
Total length:			42:45

== Personnel ==
Cash engineer David "Fergie" Ferguson (assisted by Jimmy Tittle) and Rubin oversaw the completion of the recordings. Other musicians on the album include keyboardist Benmont Tench and guitarists Mike Campbell, Smoky Hormel, Matt Sweeney and Jonny Polonsky.

- Johnny Cash – vocal, guitar
- Laura Cash – fiddle
- Dennis Crouch – bass guitar
- Smokey Hormel – guitar
- Pat McLaughlin – guitar
- Larry Perkins – guitar
- Jonny Polonsky – guitar
- Randy Scruggs – guitar
- Marty Stuart – guitar
- Matt Sweeney – guitar
- Benmont Tench – organ, piano, harpsichord
- Pete Wade – guitar
- Mac Wiseman – guitar
- David Campbell – string arrangements

Production and technical staff

- Martyn Atkins – photography
- Christine Cano – art direction, design
- John Carter Cash – executive producer
- Lindsay Chase – production coordination
- Greg Fidelman – mixing
- Paul Figueroa – mixing assistant
- Dan Leffler – mixing assistant
- Vlado Meller – mastering
- Rick Rubin – producer, liner notes
- Mark Santangelo – mastering assistant
- Jimmy Tittle – assistant engineer

== Charts ==
=== Weekly charts ===
Chart (2006)	Peak position
Australian Albums (ARIA)	25
Austrian Albums (Ö3 Austria)	8
Belgian Albums (Ultratop Flanders)	5
Belgian Albums (Ultratop Wallonia)	17
Canadian Albums (Billboard)	4
Danish Albums (Hitlisten)	5
Dutch Albums (Album Top 100)	17
Finnish Albums (Suomen virallinen lista)	7
French Albums (SNEP)	96
German Albums (Offizielle Top 100)	7
Irish Albums (IRMA)	1
Italian Albums (FIMI)	47
New Zealand Albums (RMNZ)	25
Norwegian Albums (VG-lista)	3
Scottish Albums (OCC)	5
Swedish Albums (Sverigetopplistan)	1
Swiss Albums (Schweizer Hitparade)	16
UK Albums (OCC)	9
US Billboard 200	1
US Top Country Albums (Billboard)	1
UK Country Albums (OCC)	1

=== Year-end charts ===
Chart (2006)	Position
German Albums (Offizielle Top 100)	86
Swedish Albums (Sverigetopplistan)	95
UK Albums (OCC)	192
US Billboard 200	182
US Top Country Albums (Billboard)	35

== Certifications ==
Region	Certification	Certified units/sales
Canada (Music Canada)	Gold	50,000^{^}
Denmark (IFPI Danmark)	Gold	20,000^{^}
Germany (BVMI)	Gold	100,000^{^}
Ireland (IRMA)	Gold	7,500^{^}
United Kingdom (BPI)	Gold	100,000^{^}
United States (RIAA)	Gold	500,000^{^}
^{^} Shipments figures based on certification alone.
