= If You Talk in Your Sleep =

Single by Elvis Presley

from the album Promised Land
- B-side: "Help Me"
- Released: May 10, 1974
- Recorded: December 12/13, 1973
- Studio: Stax Studios, Memphis
- Genre: Funk
- Length: 2:35
- Label: RCA Victor
- Songwriters: Red West and Johnny Christopher
- Producer: Felton Jarvis

Elvis Presley singles chronology
"Take Good Care of Her" / "I've Got a Thing About You, Baby" (1974)	"If You Talk in Your Sleep" / "Help Me" (1974)	"It's Midnight" / "Promised Land" (1974)

"If You Talk in Your Sleep" is a 1974 Elvis Presley song released as a single and featured on Elvis Presley's 1975 album Promised Land. The song was written by Red West and Johnny Christopher, who had earlier written "Mama Liked the Roses" and "Always On My Mind", both recorded by Elvis Presley.

== Background ==
The song was recorded during sessions at Stax Records in Memphis, Tennessee, in December 1973.

== Chart performance ==
Released as a single in North America on May 10, 1974, with the B-side "Help Me", it reached No. 6 on the Billboard Adult Contemporary chart in June 1974 and No. 17 on the Billboard Pop Singles chart in August 1974.

== Cover versions ==
- The song was covered by Little Milton and reached No. 34 on the Billboard soul singles chart in April 1975.
