= St. Louis to Liverpool =

Studio album by Chuck Berry
- Released: November 1964
- Recorded: December 1957 – August 1964
- Studios: Chess, Chicago
- Genre: Rock and roll
- Length: 31:34
- Label: Chess
- Producers: Leonard Chess, Phil Chess

Chuck Berry chronology
Two Great Guitars (1964)	St. Louis to Liverpool (1964)	Chuck Berry in London (1965)

Singles from St. Louis to Liverpool
- 1. "No Particular Place to Go" Released: May 1964; 2. "You Never Can Tell" Released: August 1964; 3. "Little Marie" Released: October 1964; 4. "Promised Land" Released: December 1964

Professional ratings
Review scores
Source	Rating
Allmusic	5/5 stars

St. Louis to Liverpool is the seventh studio album by American rock and roll musician Chuck Berry. Released in 1964 by Chess Records, it peaked at number 124 on the US Billboard album chart, the first of Berry's studio albums to appear on the chart. Music critic Dave Marsh called St. Louis to Liverpool "one of the greatest rock and roll records ever made".

== Background ==
On October 18, 1963, Berry was released from prison after having spent 20 months incarcerated owing to conviction on a charge under the Mann Act. During his time in prison, emerging rock groups had found inspiration in his work. The Beach Boys had based their number-three hit single "Surfin' U.S.A." on his "Sweet Little Sixteen"; the Beatles had included "Roll Over Beethoven" on their second American album; the debut single in the United Kingdom by the Rolling Stones was their cover of "Come On", and they had included "Carol" on their first American album, England's Newest Hitmakers.

Wishing to capitalize on his popularity during the British Invasion, Berry and Chess Records fashioned this album to appeal to young buyers. St. Louis to Liverpool includes four of the five charting singles he enjoyed in 1964, the final year he would have multiple records appearing on the Billboard Hot 100: "No Particular Place to Go", "You Never Can Tell", "Promised Land", and "Little Marie", a sequel to "Memphis, Tennessee". The additional eight tracks included the four B-sides of those singles: "Our Little Rendezvous", a B-side from 1960; a previously unreleased alternate take of his 1958 Christmas single "Merry Christmas Baby"; an instrumental outtake from a 1950s session; and "Liverpool Drive", a recent instrumental.

On April 13, 2004, the Chronicles division of the Universal Music Group remastered the album for CD with three bonus tracks as part of its 50th-anniversary commemorative of Chess Records, including "O'Rangutang", the flip side of the fifth of his 1964 charting singles "Nadine (Is It You?)", and a track that had appeared on the 1990 rarities album Missing Berries. In 2008, Mobile Fidelity Sound Lab reissued the album with Berry Is on Top on an Ultradisc II Gold compact disc.

== Track listing ==
All tracks are written by Chuck Berry except where noted.

Side One
No.	Title	Length
1.	"Little Marie"	2:37
2.	"Our Little Rendezvous"	2:03
3.	"No Particular Place to Go"	2:44
4.	"You Two"	2:11
5.	"Promised Land"	2:24
6.	"You Never Can Tell"	2:43

Side Two
No.	Title	Writer(s)	Length
1.	"Go Bobby Soxer"		2:59
2.	"Things I Used to Do"	Eddie Jones	2:42
3.	"Liverpool Drive" (instrumental)		2:56
4.	"Night Beat" (instrumental)		2:46
5.	"Merry Christmas Baby"	Lou Baxter, Johnny Moore	3:14
6.	"Brenda Lee"		2:15
Total length:			31:34

=== 2004 reissue bonus tracks ===
No.	Title	Writer(s)	Length
13.	"Fraulein"	Lawton Williams	2:51
14.	"O'Rangutang" (Instrumental)		3:02
15.	"The Little Girl from Central" (Early version of "Sweet Little Sixteen")		2:39
Total length:			40:06

== Personnel ==
- Chuck Berry – vocals, guitars
- Matt "Guitar" Murphy – electric guitar (track 2)
- Johnnie Johnson – piano (tracks 2, 6, 8, 11, 13–15)
- Lafayette Leake – piano (tracks 5, 10, 12)
- Paul Williams – piano (tracks 3–4, 9)
- Willie Dixon – bass (tracks 2, 5, 10–12)
- Odie Payne – drums (all tracks except 2, 10–11)
- Fred Below – drums (tracks 10–11)
- Ebby Hardy or Jaspar Thomas – drums (track 2)
- Leroy C. Davis – tenor saxophone (tracks 2, 6, 13–14)
- James Robinson – tenor saxophone (tracks 6, 13–14)
- Louis Satterfield – bass (track 3 and some others)

=== Technical ===
- Andy McKaie – reissue producer
- Vartan – reissue art direction
- Mike Fink – reissue design

== Charts ==
=== Album ===
Chart performance for St. Louis to Liverpool
Chart (1964–1965)	Peak position
US Billboard 200	124

Chart (2026)	Peak position
US Top Blues Albums (Billboard)	10

=== Single ===
Year	Single	Chart	Position
1964	"Little Marie"	Billboard Hot 100	54
1964	"No Particular Place to Go"	Billboard Hot 100	10
1964	"You Never Can Tell"	Billboard Hot 100	14
1965	"Promised Land"	Billboard Hot 100	41
