= On the Evening Train =

Song by Johnny Cash
- Released: 2006
- Recorded: 2003
- Genre: Country
- Length: 4:12
- Songwriters: Hank Williams, Audrey Williams
- Producer: Rick Rubin

"On the Evening Train" is a song by Hank Williams. It appeared on a 1991 album Hank Williams Songbook. It is the only song whose authorship is credited to Hank Williams and his wife Audrey Williams, although Audrey maintained that she made contributions to the song "Wedding Bells," which is credited to Williams and his producer Fred Rose.

== Johnny Cash recording ==
Johnny Cash also recorded this song. It appeared on his 2006 album American V: A Hundred Highways.
