= 2024 Skate America =

Figure skating competition

- Type: Grand Prix
- Date: October 18 – 20
- Season: 2024–25
- Location: Allen, Texas, United States
- Host: U.S. Figure Skating
- Venue: Credit Union of Texas Event Center

Champions
- Men's singles: (United States) Ilia Malinin
- Women's singles: (Japan) Wakaba Higuchi
- Pairs: (Japan) Riku Miura and Ryuichi Kihara
- Ice dance: (United Kingdom) Lilah Fear and Lewis Gibson
- Previous: 2023 Skate America
- Next: 2025 Skate America
- Next Grand Prix: 2024 Skate Canada International

The 2024 Skate America was the first event of the 2024–25 ISU Grand Prix of Figure Skating: a senior-level international invitational competition series. It was held at the Credit Union of Texas Event Center in Allen, Texas, from October 18–20. Medals were awarded in men's singles, women's singles, pair skating, and ice dance. Skaters earned points toward qualifying for the 2024–25 Grand Prix Final.

== Entries ==
The International Skating Union announced the preliminary assignments on June 9, 2024.

Country	Men	Women	Pairs	Ice dance
Austria	—	Olga Mikutina	—	
Belgium	—	Nina Pinzarrone	—	
Canada	Wesley Chiu	—		Alicia Fabbri; Paul Ayer
Canada	—	—		Marie-Jade Lauriault; Romain Le Gac
Czech Republic	—			Kateřina Mrázková; Daniel Mrázek
Finland	—		Milania Väänänen; Filippo Clerici	—
France	Kévin Aymoz	Léa Serna	—	
France	François Pitot	—	—	
Georgia	Nika Egadze	—	Anastasiia Metelkina; Luka Berulava	Diana Davis; Gleb Smolkin
Great Britain	—		Anastasia Vaipan-Law; Luke Digby	Lilah Fear; Lewis Gibson
Hungary	—		Maria Pavlova; Alexei Sviatchenko	—
Israel	—			Elizabeth Tkachenko; Alexei Kiliakov
Japan	Kao Miura	Yuna Aoki	Riku Miura; Ryuichi Kihara	—
Japan	Koshiro Shimada	Wakaba Higuchi	—	—
Japan	Nozomu Yoshioka	Rinka Watanabe	—	—
Latvia	Deniss Vasiļjevs	Sofja Stepčenko	—	
Mexico	Donovan Carrillo	—		
Spain	—			Olivia Smart; Tim Dieck
South Korea	—	Kim Min-chae	—	
Switzerland	—	Livia Kaiser	—	
United States	Lucas Broussard	Isabeau Levito	Alisa Efimova; Misha Mitrofanov	Madison Chock; Evan Bates
United States	Ilia Malinin	Elyce Lin-Gracey	Ellie Kam; Daniel O'Shea	Annabelle Morozov; Jeffrey Chen
United States	Maxim Naumov	Bradie Tennell	Katie McBeath; Daniil Parkman	Leah Neset; Artem Markelov

=== Changes to preliminary assignments ===
Discipline	Withdrew		Added		Notes	Ref.
Discipline	Date	Skater(s)	Date	Skater(s)	Notes	Ref.
Women	August 6	(South Korea); Lee Hae-in	August 9	(South Korea); Kim Min-chae	Suspension (Lee)	
Women	August 6	(South Korea); You Young	August 9	(Austria); Olga Mikutina		
Men	—		September 13	(United States); Lucas Broussard	Host picks	
Women	—		September 13	(United States); Elyce Lin-Gracey	Host picks	
Pairs	—		September 13	(United States); Katie McBeath; Daniil Parkman	Host picks	
Ice dance	—		September 13	(United States); Isabella Flores; Ivan Desyatov	Host picks	
Ice dance	October 3	(Canada); Laurence Fournier Beaudry; Nikolaj Sørensen	October 8	(Germany); Jennifer Janse van Rensburg; Benjamin Steffan	Suspension (Sørensen)	
Ice dance	October 15	(Germany); Jennifer Janse van Rensburg; Benjamin Steffan	October 15	(Canada); Alicia Fabbri; Paul Ayer		
Ice dance	October 16	(United States); Isabella Flores; Ivan Desyatov	October 16	(United States); Annabelle Morozov; Jeffrey Chen	Suspension (Desyatov)	

== Results ==
=== Men's singles ===
Men's results
Rank	Skater	Nation	Total points	SP		FS	
1st place, gold medalist(s)	Ilia Malinin	United States	290.12	1	99.69	2	190.43
2nd place, silver medalist(s)	Kévin Aymoz	France	282.88	4	92.04	1	190.84
3rd place, bronze medalist(s)	Kao Miura	Japan	278.67	2	99.54	3	179.13
4	Nika Egadze	Georgia	261.71	3	93.89	4	167.82
5	Deniss Vasiļjevs	Latvia	251.47	5	85.10	5	166.37
6	Koshiro Shimada	Japan	219.68	6	81.88	10	137.80
7	Maxim Naumov	United States	216.38	8	73.11	7	143.27
8	Nozomu Yoshioka	Japan	215.92	7	80.79	11	135.13
9	Wesley Chiu	Canada	206.94	10	66.86	9	140.08
10	Lucas Broussard	United States	206.57	11	65.31	8	141.26
11	François Pitot	France	202.96	12	56.16	6	146.80
12	Donovan Carrillo	Mexico	195.80	9	67.48	12	128.32

=== Women's singles ===
Women's results
Rank	Skater	Nation	Total points	SP		FS	
1st place, gold medalist(s)	Wakaba Higuchi	Japan	196.93	4	66.12	1	130.81
2nd place, silver medalist(s)	Rinka Watanabe	Japan	195.22	3	66.54	3	128.68
3rd place, bronze medalist(s)	Isabeau Levito	United States	194.83	1	68.43	5	126.40
4	Nina Pinzarrone	Belgium	193.61	5	62.85	2	130.76
5	Bradie Tennell	United States	192.04	2	66.99	6	125.05
6	Elyce Lin-Gracey	United States	183.94	7	60.22	7	123.72
7	Yuna Aoki	Japan	183.03	10	56.51	4	126.52
8	Livia Kaiser	Switzerland	177.67	8	58.72	8	118.95
9	Olga Mikutina	Austria	166.77	9	56.81	9	109.96
10	Kim Min-chae	South Korea	165.57	6	60.66	11	104.91
11	Léa Serna	France	151.87	12	42.85	10	109.02
12	Sofja Stepčenko	Latvia	137.92	11	44.56	12	93.36

=== Pairs ===
Pairs' results
Rank	Team	Nation	Total points	SP		FS	
1st place, gold medalist(s)	Riku Miura; Ryuichi Kihara	Japan	214.23	1	77.79	1	136.44
2nd place, silver medalist(s)	Ellie Kam; Daniel O'Shea	United States	201.73	2	70.66	2	131.07
3rd place, bronze medalist(s)	Alisa Efimova; Misha Mitrofanov	United States	191.51	5	63.05	3	128.46
4	Anastasiia Metelkina; Luka Berulava	Georgia	191.43	3	68.64	4	122.79
5	Maria Pavlova; Alexei Sviatchenko	Hungary	184.01	4	65.11	5	118.90
6	Anastasia Vaipan-Law; Luke Digby	Great Britain	180.13	6	61.31	6	118.82
7	Katie McBeath; Daniil Parkman	United States	168.08	8	56.69	7	111.39
8	Milania Väänänen; Filippo Clerici	Finland	156.55	7	60.23	8	96.32

=== Ice dance ===
Ice dance results
Rank	Skater	Nation	Total points	RD		FD	
1st place, gold medalist(s)	Lilah Fear; Lewis Gibson	Great Britain	206.38	1	83.56	2	122.82
2nd place, silver medalist(s)	Madison Chock; Evan Bates	United States	205.63	2	77.88	1	127.75
3rd place, bronze medalist(s)	Olivia Smart; Tim Dieck	Spain	189.44	5	70.99	3	118.45
4	Diana Davis; Gleb Smolkin	Georgia	187.05	3	73.16	4	113.89
5	Leah Neset; Artem Markelov	United States	179.38	8	69.68	5	109.70
6	Kateřina Mrázková; Daniel Mrázek	Czech Republic	179.34	7	70.09	6	109.25
7	Marie-Jade Lauriault; Romain Le Gac	Canada	174.91	6	70.38	7	104.53
8	Elizabeth Tkachenko; Alexei Kiliakov	Israel	166.94	10	65.13	8	101.81
9	Annabelle Morozov; Jeffrey Chen	United States	166.73	9	66.57	9	100.16
10	Alicia Fabbri; Paul Ayer	Canada	165.96	4	71.75	10	94.21
