= Help Me (Kris Kristofferson song) =

Song by Larry Gatlin

Single by Elvis Presley

from the album Promised Land
- A-side: "If You Talk in Your Sleep"
- Released: 1974
- Recorded: December 1973
- Studio: Stax, Memphis, Tennessee
- Genre: Country, gospel, Christian country
- Length: 2:28
- Songwriter: Larry Gatlin
- Producer: Felton Jarvis

Elvis Presley singles chronology
"Take Good Care of Her" / "I've Got a Thing About You, Baby" (1974)	"If You Talk in Your Sleep" / "Help Me" (1974)	"It's Midnight" / "Promised Land" (1974)

"Help Me" is a song written by Larry Gatlin. A country gospel song, the lyrics tell the story of a world-weary and tired man pleading for guidance and reassurance from God. Gatlin performed the song at the funerals of both June Carter and Johnny Cash and dedicates the song to them during every performance.

The song became most famous in a version by Elvis Presley. In 1974, Presley released the song as part of a double A-sided single with "If You Talk in Your Sleep". "Help Me" became the side promoted to country radio, and the song reached No. 6 on the Billboard Hot Country Singles chart on the week of August 10, 1974. ("If You Talk in Your Sleep" reached No. 17 on the Billboard Hot 100, also during the summer of 1974.)

Previously, "Help Me" was recorded by:

- Kris Kristofferson in 1972, the first recording of the song, on his album Jesus Was a Capricorn and subsequently released as the B-side to the single "Why Me".
- Ray Price, on his 1973 album She's Got to Be a Saint.
- Connie Smith, on her 1973 album God Is Abundant.
- Johnny Cash, on his 1973 album The Gospel Road.
- London Parris and the Apostles, on the 1973 album Why Me?.

== Johnny Cash versions ==
"Help Me"

Song by Johnny Cash

from the album American V: A Hundred Highways
- Released: 2006
- Label: American
- Songwriter: Larry Gatlin
- Producer: Rick Rubin

Music video
- "Help Me" on YouTube

Johnny Cash covered the song on his 1973 album The Gospel Road, which was the soundtrack to the film of the same title, and on the posthumous 2006 album American V: A Hundred Highways. The latter version had a music video shot for it. On The Gospel Road, the song's title is abbreviated to "Help" and is performed in several parts on the album and film.

== Charts ==
=== Elvis Presley version ===
Chart (1974)	Peak position
US Billboard Hot Country Singles	6

* As "Help Me" / "If You Talk in Your Sleep"
