= My Boy (Richard Harris album) =

Studio album by Richard Harris
- Released: November 1971
- Studios: Chapell's Studios and Advision Studios
- Genres: Vocal, baroque pop, rock
- Length: 40:15
- Label: Dunhill
- Producers: Johnny Harris, Bill Martin / Phil Coulter

Richard Harris chronology
The Yard Went On Forever (1968)	My Boy (1971)	Slides (1972)

My Boy is the third studio album of Richard Harris, released in 1971 by Dunhill Records. The album is about a love story between two people, which in time, develops from something platonic to a lost romance in their couplehood. There are only four Jimmy Webb songs on this album.

== Origins of the album ==
In the year 1971, during a visit to Britain, Dunhill Records president, Jay Lasker, completed a record deal negotiations with Richard Harris. His first single release My Boy, which entered a music contest at Radio Luxembourg Grand Prix.

== Reception ==
The album received mixed reviews, with William York from AllMusic describing it as "another difficult (and depressing) concept album". He further notes that this album is not for those seeking standard Harris fare, and those who want to introduce themselves to his art should start with A Tramp Shining or one of the "best-of" offerings. A review by Jean Ehmsen of the St. Louis Post-Dispatch focused on the strengths of Harris' voice, along with the romantic and paternal aspects of the album while ignoring any darker overtones.

Professional ratings
Review scores
Source	Rating
Allmusic	3.5/5 stars

== Track listing ==
The album concept and synopsis by Richard Harris.

Side one
No.	Title	Writer(s)	Length
1.	"Beth"	Jimmy Webb	1:58
2.	"Sidewalk Song"	Jimmy Webb	3:21
3.	"Proposal"	Bill Martin, Phil Coulter	3:23
4.	"Ballad To An Unborn Child"	Johnny Harris, John Bromley	3:00
5.	"This Is Our Child"	Bill Martin, Phil Coulter	3:36
6.	"Like Father Like Son"	Johnny Harris, John Bromley	3:06

Side two
No.	Title	Writer(s)	Length
1.	"Requiem"	Jimmy Webb	5:02
2.	"This Is Where I Came In"	Jimmy Webb	3:37
3.	"Why Do You Leave Me?"	Richard Harris, Bill Whelan	2:36
4.	"All The Broken Children"	Richard Harris	2:36
5.	"My Boy"	Bill Martin, Phil Coulter	3:18
6.	"This Is The Way"	Johnny Harris, John Bromley	4:42
Total length:			40:15

== Personnel ==
- Richard Harris – vocals
- Johnny Harris – producer, arranger
- Bill Martin and Phil Coulter – producer, side one track 3, 5 and side two track 5
- Dermont Harris - executive producer

Technical

- Barry McKinley – photography
- Peter Whorf – album design
- John Timperly - Chapell's Studios
- Martin Rushent - Advision Studios
- A Limbridge Productions

== Chart performance ==
Chart peaks for My Boy
Chart (1971)	Peak position
US Billboard Top LP's	71
US Cashbox Top 100 Albums	42
