= Thinking About You (Elvis Presley song) =

Single by Elvis Presley

from the album Promised Land
- A-side: "My Boy"; "Thinking About You"
- Released: January 4, 1975
- Recorded: December 12, 1973
- Genre: Country
- Length: 3:00
- Songwriter(s): Tim Baty

Elvis Presley singles chronology
"Promised Land" / "It's Midnight" (1974)	"My Boy" / "Thinking About You" (1975)	"T-R-O-U-B-L-E" / "Mr. Songman" (1975)

"Thinking About You" is a song performed by Elvis Presley and originally released on his 1975 album Promised Land.

In January 1975 it also was released on the RCA single PB-10191, as the flip side to "My Boy" (a song from the 1974 album Good Times). In 1977 the single was reissued as part of the black-labelled Gold Standard Series (s/n GB-10489).

== Writing and recording ==
The song was written by Tim Baty.

Presley recorded it on December 12, 1973, at the December 10–16 recording sessions for RCA at the Stax Studios in Memphis, Tennessee.

The original recorded master sound track was longer, but before release it was shortened by 1 minute 40 seconds.

== Track listings ==
7" single (RCA PB-10191)

1. "My Boy" (3:13)
2. "Thinking About You" (2:59)
