= Don't It Make You Want to Go Home =

Single by Joe South and the Believers

from the album Don't It Make You Want to Go Home?
- B-side: "Hearts Desire"
- Released: August 1969
- Genre: Country; easy listening
- Label: Capitol
- Songwriter: Joe South
- Producer: Joe South

Joe South and the Believers singles chronology
"Leaning on You" (1969)	"Don't It Make You Want to Go Home" (1969)	"Walk a Mile in My Shoes" (1970)

"Don't It Make You Want to Go Home" is a 1969 song by Joe South. South was also producer and arranger of the track and of its B-side, "Hearts Desire." The single was credited to "Joe South and the Believers"; the Believers included his brother Tommy South and his sister-in-law Barbara South.

"Don't It Make You Want to Go Home" became a hit on the pop, country, and easy listening charts of both the U.S. and Canada. It was also a top 20 hit in Australia.

== Charts ==
Chart (1969)	Peak position
Australia (Go-Set)	14
Canada RPM Top Singles	42
Canada RPM Adult Contemporary	18
Canada RPM Country	11
U.S. Billboard Hot 100	41
U.S. Billboard Easy Listening	16
U.S. Billboard Country	27
U.S. Cash Box Top 100	47

== Brook Benton cover ==
"Don't It Make You Want to Go Home"

Single by Brook Benton

from the album Homestyle
- B-side: "I've Gotta Be Me"
- Released: May 1970
- Genre: R&B; easy listening
- Label: Cotillion
- Songwriter: Joe South

Brook Benton singles chronology
"My Way" (1970)	"Don't It Make You Want to Go Home" (1970)	"Shoes" (1970)

Brook Benton covered "Don't It Make You Want to Go Home" in 1970. It is a track on his Homestyle LP. Benton's rendition reached #45 in the U.S. and #41 in Canada. His version also reached number four on the U.S. Adult Contemporary chart.

The B-side, "I've Gotta Be Me," was taken from his previous album, Brook Benton Today.

=== Chart history ===
Chart (1970)	Peak position
Australia (Go-Set)	13
Canada RPM Top Singles	41
U.S. Billboard Hot 100	45
U.S. Billboard Easy Listening	4
U.S. Billboard R&B singles	31
U.S. Cash Box Top 100	48
