= Jeffrey Chen =

American figure skater (born 2002)

Jeffrey Chen 陳楷捷
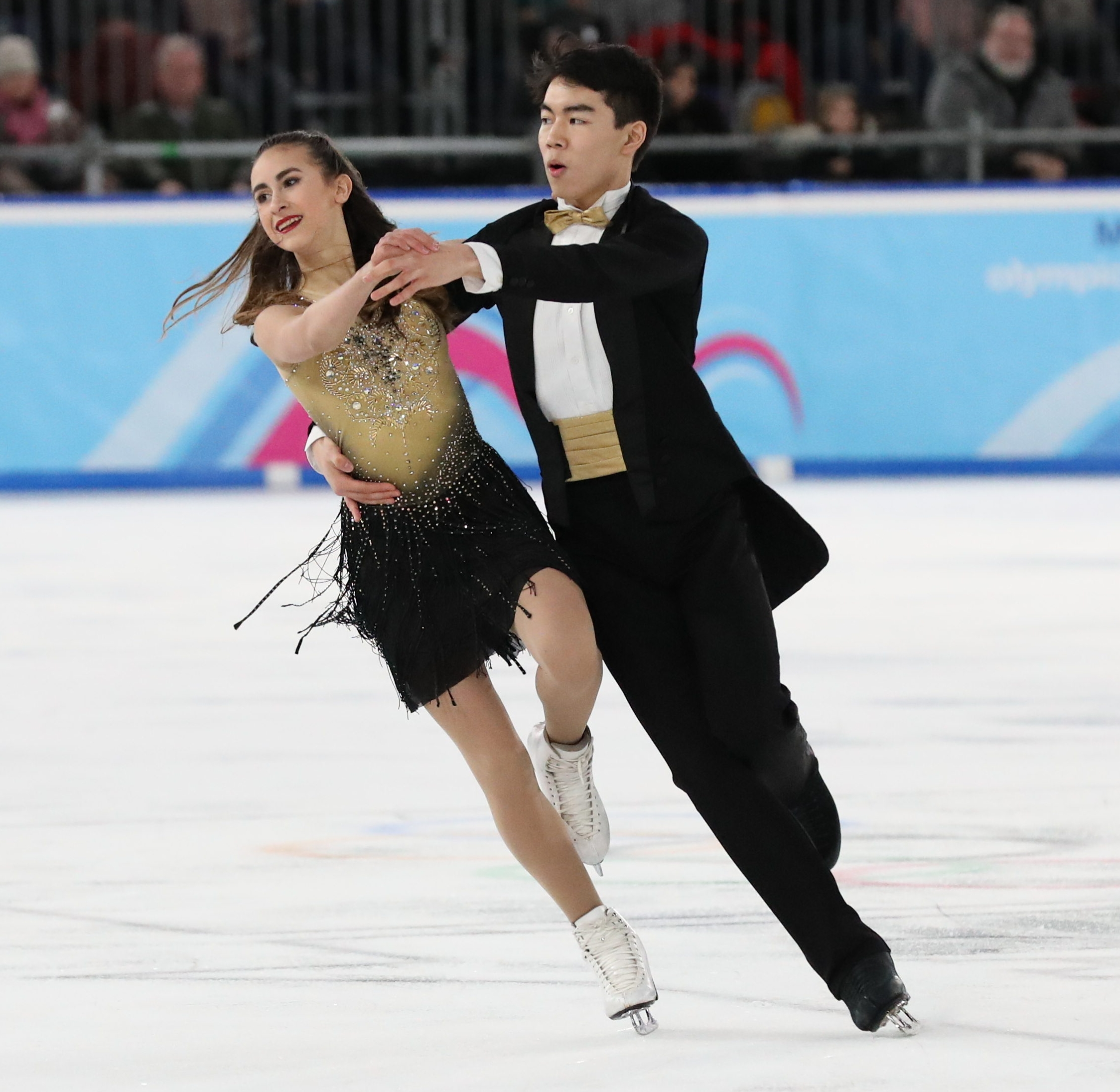
- Wolfkostin and Chen at the 2020 Winter Youth Olympics

Personal information
- Born: July 21, 2002 (age 24) Fremont, California, U.S.
- Home town: Wolverine Lake, Michigan, U.S.
- Height: 5 ft 9 in (1.75 m)

Figure skating career
- Country: United States
- Discipline: Ice dance
- Partner: Annabelle Morozov; Yahli Pedersen; Katarina Wolfkostin
- Coach: Charlie White; Greg Zuerlein; Tanith Belbin White; Nikolai Morozov
- Skating club: Peninsula Skating Club
- Began skating: 2010

Medal record
Winter Youth Olympics
Bronze medal – third place	2020 Lausanne	Ice dance

Jeffrey Chen (born July 21, 2002) is an American ice dancer.

With current skating partner, Annabelle Morozov, he is the 2024 Lombardia Trophy silver medalist.

With former skating partner, Yahli Pedersen, they were the 2023 JGP Turkey and the 2023 JGP Hungary silver medalists.

With other former skating partner, Katarina Wolfkostin, they were alternates at the 2022 Winter Olympics in Beijing, the 2022 Budapest Trophy bronze medalists, the 2021 U.S. junior national champions, the 2021 JGP France champions, the 2021 JGP Slovenia silver medalists, and the 2020 Winter Youth Olympics bronze medalists.

On February 19, 2025, Chen was suspended by the U.S. Center for SafeSport for allegations of misconduct.

== Personal life ==
Jeffrey Chen was born in Fremont, California, on July 21, 2002, to Taiwanese parents, Hsiu-Hui Tseng and Chih-Hsiu Chen. His older sister Karen also represented the U.S. internationally in singles. Chen enjoys hip-hop dance, gaming, and photography. He has a pet sun conure named Mango.

== Career ==
=== Early career ===
Chen began skating in 2010 after following his older sister Karen onto the ice. He competed in singles until the 2014–15 season and was the 2014 U.S. national juvenile pewter medalist. As a singles skater, Chen trained in Riverside, California, alongside his sister under Tammy Gambill.

Chen switched to ice dance and teamed up with Layla Karnes in the 2015–16 season. Together, they were the 2016 U.S. national juvenile ice dance champions and the 2017 U.S. national intermediate silver medalists. Chen then moved to Michigan to live with his mother, and he then changed coaches and began training with Marina Zoueva before the next season. He competed with Gianna Buckley during the 2017–18 season, winning the 2018 U.S. national novice silver medal. Chen then skated two months with Anna Lavrova during the 2018–19 season, but the partnership ended before the 2019 U.S. Championships.

=== Partnership with Wolfkostin ===
==== 2019–2020 season: Youth Olympics bronze ====
Wolfkostin/Chen at the 2020 Winter Youth Olympics

Chen began skating with Katarina Wolfkostin in 2019, and he moved to train with her coaches, Igor Shpilband and Pasquale

Camerlengo, in Novi, Michigan. They placed fifth in their international debut at 2019 JGP France. Wolfkostin/Chen improved to fourth at 2019 JGP Russia after placing second in the free dance. They won the inaugural U.S. Ice Dance Final to qualify for the 2020 U.S. Championships. Wolfkostin/Chen won their first international medal at the 2019 Golden Spin of Zagreb, earning the silver medal behind Ushakova/Nekrasov of Russia.

Wolfkostin/Chen were named as the sole ice dance entrant on the U.S. team for the 2020 Winter Youth Olympics. They were fifth after the rhythm dance, before placing third in the free dance, to win the bronze medal overall behind Russians Khavronina/Cirisano and Tyutyunina/Shustitsky. Their medal was the first won by Team USA at the 2020 Winter Youth Olympics. Wolfkostin/Chen were drawn as part of Team Determination for the team event, alongside singles skaters Cha Young-hyun of South Korea and Nella Pelkonen of Finland and pairs skaters Brooke McIntosh / Brandon Toste of Canada. They placed fourth in the free dance segment to help Team Determination finish fourth after losing the tie-breaker.

Wolfkostin/Chen placed fourth in the rhythm dance and second in the free dance to win the silver medal at the 2020 U.S. Championships, behind Nguyen/Kolesnik. Assigned to compete at their first World Junior Championships, they placed seventh.

==== 2020–2021 season ====
The season was shortened due to the COVID-19 pandemic, with domestic competitions initially changed to a virtual format, leading up to the 2021 U.S. Championships. Wolfkostin/Chen placed first in the rhythm dance and first in the free dance in both rounds of the 2020 Virtual ISP Points Challenge, and second in the free dance at the 2020 Virtual U.S. Championship Series. Wolfkostin/Chen then competed at the 2021 U.S. Championships, after Chen was medically cleared to skate after a second opinion was obtained following a knee injury, originally thought to be an incapacitating ACL tear. Despite the injury, they placed first in both the rhythm and free dance, earning them the gold medal for the national title.

==== 2021–2022 season ====
Returning to international competition for the first time in over a year, Wolfkostin/Chen began on the Junior Grand Prix by competing at the first French JGP of 2021, in Courchevel. They placed first in both segments, easily winning the gold medal. At their second event, 2021 JGP Slovenia, they placed third in the rhythm dance but made up ground in the free dance, placing second in that segment and placing second overall. Assigned to their first senior event just a few weeks later, Wolfkostin/Chen placed ninth at the 2021 CS Cup of Austria. Their JGP results had qualified them for the 2021–22 Junior Grand Prix Final, but it was subsequently canceled as a result of travel restrictions prompted by the COVID-19 Omicron variant.

Rather than seeking to defend their national junior title, Wolfkostin/Chen opted to compete as seniors at the 2022 U.S. Championships. They finished in sixth place overall, notably beating former national pewter medalists Carreira/Ponomarenko. When the U.S. team was announced for the 2022 Winter Olympics in Beijing, Wolfkostin/Chen were named as alternates.

Due to the pandemic, the 2022 World Junior Championships could not be held as scheduled in Sofia in early March and, as a result, were rescheduled for Tallinn in mid-April. Due to Vladimir Putin's invasion of Ukraine, the International Skating Union banned all Russian and Belarusian athletes from participating, which had a significant impact on the field of figure skating and ice dance. Wolfkostin/Chen were considered frontrunners for the title, however, following a fall at the beginning of the rhythm dance, they placed ninth in that segment, 6.40 points behind third-place Bashynska/Beaumont of Canada. Wolfkostin/Chen mounted a comeback in the free dance, placing second in that segment with a score within 0.04 points of their personal best, which raised them to fourth place overall. They finished 0.37 points back of bronze medalists Bashynska/Beaumont.

==== 2022–2023 season ====
Despite their disappointing result at the World Junior Championships, it did not alter Wolfkostin and Chen's plans to move up to the senior level for the following season. Chen would later explain their reasoning that "we had already competed a bit in seniors last year, and we were excited to move into seniors. We feel that it's inspiring and helps us grow faster. It also relieves a bit of pressure; being the ones who chase after people, instead of being targeted." In addition, Wolfkostin and Chen announced in May that they would be leaving coach Igor Shpilband to train at the new Michigan Ice Dance Academy in Canton, Michigan, under coaches Greg Zuerlein, Tanith Belbin White, and Olympic champion Charlie White. This also aligned with their mutual decision to attend the nearby University of Michigan in Ann Arbor.

The team debuted new senior programs at the 2022 Lake Placid Ice Dance International, where they won the bronze medal. Shortly afterward, they appeared on the Challenger series at the 2022 CS U.S. Classic, finishing sixth. At their second Challenger, the 2022 CS Budapest Trophy, Wolfkostin/Chen won the bronze medal, setting three new personal bests in the process. In November, they were invited to make their senior Grand Prix debut, finishing in eighth place at the 2022 Grand Prix de France. They were tenth at the 2022 NHK Trophy, struggling with level issues on several elements. Chen later said that illness and a training injury had hindered them during the Grand Prix. At the 2023 U.S. Championships, they placed tenth in the rhythm dance and fifth in the free dance, resulting in a seventh-place finish overall.

On February 8, Wolfkostin and Chen announced the end of their partnership.

=== Partnership with Pedersen ===
==== 2023–2024 season ====
In April 2023, Chen formed a new partnership with Yahli Pedersen. Opting to start their competitive career together on the junior level, they were assigned to the Junior Grand Prix. They won the rhythm dance at the 2023 JGP Turkey in Istanbul, but after Pedersen fell in the free dance they came fifth in that segment and dropped to second place overall behind Ukrainians Pinchuk/Pogorielov. At their second event, the 2023 JGP Hungary in Budapest, they placed first after the rhythm dance with a new season's best score. In the free dance, Pedersen fell again and they placed sixth in the segment. They placed second overall, coincidentally behind a different Ukrainian dance team, taking their second consecutive silver medal.

Pedersen/Chen's results qualified them for the Junior Grand Prix Final in Beijing. They finished sixth of six teams in the rhythm dance after Pedersen fell in the middle of their foxtrot pattern dance. They were fifth in the free dance, receiving a new personal best, but they remained sixth overall. Pedersen said it was "a little bit hard to regroup" after the rhythm dance error, "but we think we managed pretty well."

In January, Pedersen/Chen placed third in the rhythm dance and second in the free skate to win the silver medal at the junior level of the 2024 U.S. Championships. They were named to the 2024 Junior World team. At Junior Worlds, they were thirteenth after the Rhythm Dance. Eighth in the free dance, they pulled up to ninth overall.

In April, Pedersen announced that the two had split.

=== Partnership with Morozov ===
==== 2024–2025 season ====
In May 2024, Chen teamed up with Russian-American ice dancer, Annabelle Morozov. It was subsequently announced that they would be coached by Charlie White, Tanith Belbin, Nikolai Morozov, and Greg Zuerlein in Canton, Michigan.

In July, Morozov/Chen made their competitive debut at the Lake Placid Ice Dance International. They were with seventh after the rhythm dance and eleventh in the free dance, finishing in ninth place overall. They would go on to win their first medal together as an ice dance team, a silver at the 2024 CS Lombardia Trophy. Not initially assigned to compete on the 2024–25 Grand Prix circuit, Morozov/Chen were called up to compete at 2024 Skate America two days before the event to replace original host picks, Isabella Flores / Ivan Desyatov. It was later revealed that this was due to Desyatov being sanctioned with a temporary suspension by U.S. Center for SafeSport due to allegations of misconduct. At the event, Morozov/Chen came in ninth place.

In January, Morozov/Chen finished tenth at the 2025 U.S. Championships.

On February 18, 2025, the U.S. Center for SafeSport announced that Chen had been sanctioned with a temporary suspension due to allegations of misconduct.

== Programs ==
=== Ice dance with Annabelle Morozov ===
Season	Rhythm dance	Free dance	Exhibition
2024–2025	Get Up Offa That Thing; I Got You (I Feel Good) by James Brown; Shout by The Isley Brothers choreo. by Nikolai Morozov	Star Wars by John Williams choreo. by Nikolai Morozov	You Lost Me by Christina Aguilera

=== Ice dance with Yahli Pedersen ===
Season	Rhythm dance	Free dance
2023–2024	A Kind of Magic; Under Pressure by Queen choreo. by Charlie White, Tanith Belbin White, Greg Zuerlein	I Remember; The Point of No Return (from The Phantom of the Opera) by Andrew Lloyd Webber, Charles Hart & Richard Stilgoe choreo. by Charlie White, Tanith Belbin White, Greg Zuerlein

=== Ice dance with Katarina Wolfkostin ===
Season	Rhythm dance	Free dance
2019–2020	Foxtrot: Everything Old is New Again (from The Boy from Oz) performed by Peter Allen, Carole Bayer Sager	How Will I Know performed by Sam Smith by George Merrill, Shannon Rubicam; Fire on Fire (from Watership Down) by Sam Smith
2020–2021	Foxtrot: Everything Old is New Again (from The Boy from Oz) performed by Peter Allen, Carole Bayer Sager	Exogenesis: Symphony Part III by Muse
2021–2022	Blues: Speechless/Human Nature (Immortal version); Diamonds Are Invincible; Blues: Human Nature; March: Smooth Criminal by Michael Jackson choreo. by Igor Shpilband and Pasquale Camerlengo	Rain, In Your Black Eyes by Ezio Bosso choreo. by Igor Shpilband and Pasquale Camerlengo
2022–2023	Samba: Lagoa by Watazu; Rhumba: Summer in the Ends by Juls, Jaz Karis & George the Poet; Rhumba: Hot Oil, No Sweat by Brent Lewis; Samba: Magalenha by Sérgio Mendes choreo. by Charlie White, Tanith Belbin White, Greg Zuerlein	Light of Love; Dog Days Are Over by Florence + the Machine choreo. by Charlie White, Tanith Belbin White, Greg Zuerlein

== Competitive highlights ==
- GP – Event of the ISU Grand Prix Series
- JGP – Event of the ISU Junior Grand Prix Series
- CS – Event of the ISU Challenger Series

=== Ice dance with Annabelle Morozov ===
International
Event	24–25
U.S. Championships	10th
GP Skate America	9th
CS Lombardia Trophy	2nd
Lake Placid IDI	9th
Santa Claus Cup	TBD
TBD = Assigned; WD = Withdrew

=== Ice dance with Yahli Pedersen ===
International: Junior
Event	23–24
World Juniors	9th
JGP Final	6th
JGP Hungary	2nd
JGP Turkey	2nd
National
U.S. Championships	2nd J

=== Ice dance with Katarina Wolfkostin ===
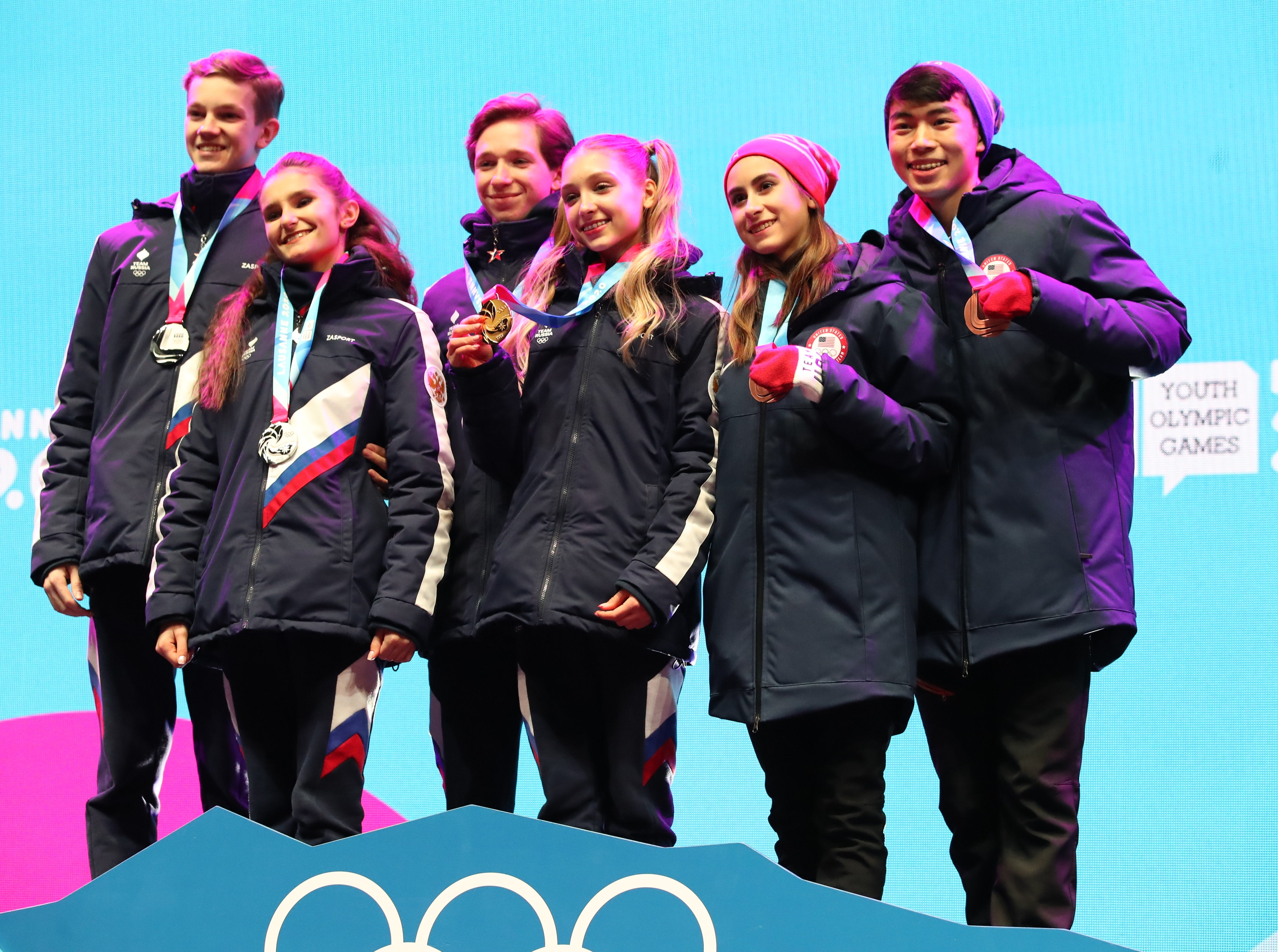
Wolfkostin/Chen (right) on the podium at the 2020 Winter Youth Olympics

Competition placements at senior level
Season	2021–22	2022–23
U.S. Championships	6th	7th
GP France		8th
GP NHK Trophy		10th
CS Budapest Trophy		3rd
CS Cup of Austria	9th	
CS U.S. Classic		6th
Lake Placid Ice Dance		3rd

Wolfkostin/Chen at the 2020 U.S. Championships

Competition placements at junior level
Season	2019–20	2020–21	2021–22
Winter Youth Olympics	3rd		
Winter Youth Olympics (Team event)	4th		
World Junior Championships	7th		4th
U.S. Championships	2nd	1st	
JGP France	5th		1st
JGP Russia	4th		
JGP Slovenia			2nd
Golden Spin of Zagreb	2nd		

== Detailed results ==
=== Ice dance with Annabelle Morozov ===
Results in the 2024–25 season
Date	Event	RD		FD		Total	
Date	Event	P	Score	P	Score	P	Score
Jul 30–31, 2024	(United States) 2024 Lake Placid Ice Dance International	17	66.78	11	96.96	9	163.74
Sep 12–15, 2024	(Italy) 2024 CS Lombardia Trophy	3	70.18	2	106.87	2	177.05
Oct 18–20, 2024	(United States) 2024 Skate America	9	66.57	9	100.16	9	166.73
Jan 20–26, 2025	(United States) 2025 U.S. Championships	10	70.64	11	102.90	10	173.54

=== Ice dance with Yahli Pedersen ===
2023–24 season
Date	Event	RD	FD	Total
Feb. 26 – Mar. 3, 2024	2024 World Junior Championships	13; 56.81	8; 87.74	9; 144.55
January 22–28, 2024	2024 U.S. Championships	3; 63.88	2; 95.09	2; 158.97
December 7–10, 2023	2023–24 JGP Final	6; 54.30	5; 90.27	6; 144.57
September 20–23, 2023	2023 JGP Hungary	1; 64.90	6; 81.38	2; 146.28
September 6–9, 2023	2023 JGP Turkey	1; 63.25	5; 83.12	2; 146.37

=== Ice dance with Katarina Wolfkostin ===
==== Senior level ====
Results in the 2021–22 season
Date	Event	RD		FD		Total	
Date	Event	P	Score	P	Score	P	Score
Nov 11–14, 2021	2021 CS Cup of Austria	10	63.04	7	101.29	9	164.33
Jan 2–9, 2022	(United States) 2022 U.S. Championships	7	75.28	6	111.99	6	187.27

Results in the 2022–23 season
Date	Event	RD		FD		Total	
Date	Event	P	Score	P	Score	P	Score
Jul 26–29, 2022	(United States) 2022 Lake Placid Ice Dance International	1	71.92	4	103.50	3	175.42
Sep 13–16, 2022	(United States) 2022 CS U.S. Classic	6	60.69	6	103.38	6	164.07
Oct 14–16, 2022	(Hungary) 2022 CS Budapest Trophy	3	72.37	3	108.09	3	180.46
Nov 4–6, 2022	2022 Grand Prix de France	7	64.18	8	100.71	8	164.89
Nov 18–20, 2022	(Japan) 2022 NHK Trophy	10	64.94	10	83.07	10	148.01
Jan 21–29, 2023	(United States) 2023 U.S. Championships	10	69.05	5	114.00	7	183.05

==== Junior level ====
Results in the 2019–20 season
Date	Event	RD		FD		Total	
Date	Event	P	Score	P	Score	P	Score
Aug 21–24, 2019	2019 JGP France	4	58.90	5	89.03	5	147.93
Sep 11–14, 2019	2019 JGP Russia	6	54.91	2	93.90	4	148.81
Dec 4–7, 2019	(Croatia) 2019 Golden Spin of Zagreb	1	66.52	2	97.29	2	163.81
Jan 10–15, 2020	(Switzerland) 2020 Winter Youth Olympics	5	57.02	3	95.41	3	152.43
Jan 10–15, 2020	(Switzerland) 2020 Winter Youth Olympics (Team event)	—N/a	—N/a	4	90.41	4	—N/a
Jan 20–26, 2020	(United States) 2020 U.S. Championships (Junior)	4	60.93	2	100.46	2	161.39
Mar 2–8, 2020	(Estonia) 2020 World Junior Championships	7	64.77	7	94.43	7	159.20

Results in the 2020–21 season
Date	Event	RD		FD		Total	
Date	Event	P	Score	P	Score	P	Score
Jan 11–21, 2021	(United States) 2021 U.S. Championships (Junior)	1	68.81	1	98.41	1	167.22

Results in the 2021–22 season
Date	Event	RD		FD		Total	
Date	Event	P	Score	P	Score	P	Score
Aug 18–21, 2021	2021 JGP France I	1	64.75	1	100.26	1	165.01
Sep 22–25, 2021	2021 JGP Slovenia	3	62.99	2	100.26	2	163.25
Apr 13–17, 2022	(Estonia) 2022 World Junior Championships	9	57.05	2	100.22	4	157.27
