= Joe South =

American singer-songwriter (1940–2012)

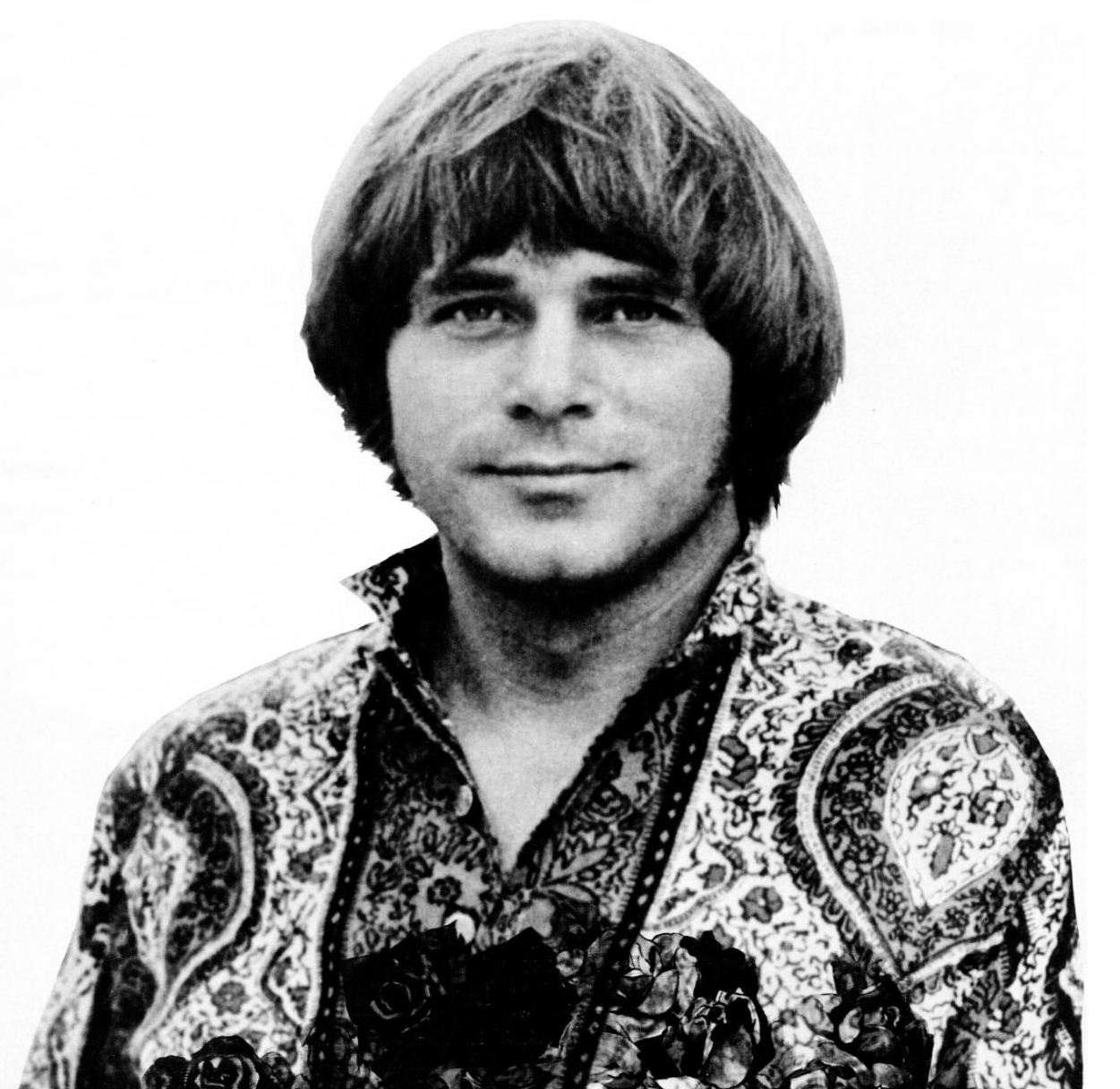
- South in 1970

Background information
- Born: Joseph Alfred Souter; February 28, 1940; Atlanta, Georgia, U.S.
- Died: September 5, 2012 (aged 72) Flowery Branch, Georgia, U.S.
- Genres: Country; folk; rock
- Occupations: Singer-songwriter, musician
- Instruments: Vocals, guitar
- Years active: 1958–2012
- Labels: National Recording Corporation, Fairlane, Delta, Allwood, Oriole, MGM, Apt Records, Capitol, Southern Tracks
- Formerly of: The Chips, Joe South and the Believers
- Website: joesouth.com

Joe South (born Joseph Alfred Souter; February 28, 1940 – September 5, 2012) was an American singer-songwriter, guitarist, and record producer. Best known for his songwriting, South won the Grammy Award for Song of the Year in 1970 for "Games People Play" and was again nominated for the award in 1972 for "Rose Garden".

== Career ==
South had met and was encouraged by Bill Lowery, an Atlanta music publisher and radio personality. He began his recording career in Atlanta with the National Recording Corporation, where he served as staff guitarist along with other NRC artists Ray Stevens and Jerry Reed. South's earliest recordings have been re-released by NRC on CD. He soon returned to Nashville with The Manrando Group and then on to Charlie Wayne Felts Promotions. (Charlie Wayne Felts is the cousin of Rockabilly Hall of Fame Inductee and Grand Ole Opry Member, Narvel Felts.)

South had his first top 50 hit in July 1958 with a cover version of the b-side of The Big Bopper's hit single "Chantilly Lace", a novelty song called "The Purple People Eater Meets the Witch Doctor". Thereafter South would concentrate mainly on songwriting.

In 1959, South wrote two songs which were recorded by Gene Vincent: "I Might Have Known", which was on the album Sounds Like Gene Vincent (Capitol Records, 1959), and "Gone Gone Gone", which was included on the album The Crazy Beat of Gene Vincent (Capitol Records, 1963).

=== Joe South and the Believers ===
Joe South and the Believers were a group that included Joe South, his brother Tommy South and sister-in-law Barbara South.

With his group, Joe South and the Believers, he recorded a cover of Angelos song, "Backfield in Motion". Backed with "I'll Come Back to You", it was released on Columbia 43983. Later they recorded "A Fool in Love". Backed with "The Great Day", it was released on Columbia 4-44218 in 1967. The ensemble would later go on to have two sizable hits.

=== Further activities ===
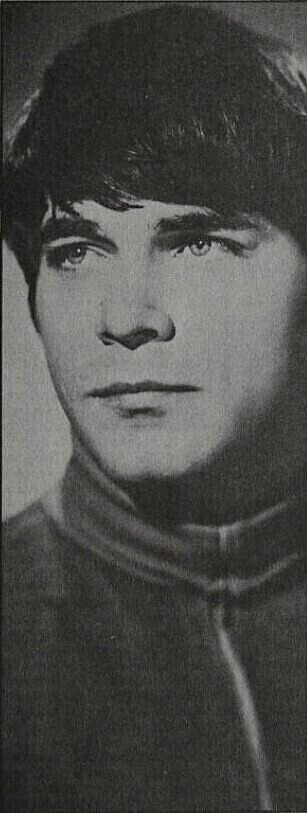
Joe South in September 1969 issue of Hit Parader

South was also a prominent sideman, playing guitar on Tommy Roe's "Sheila", bass guitar on Bob Dylan's Blonde on Blonde album, and the classic tremolo guitar intro on Aretha Franklin's "Chain of Fools". South played electric guitar on Simon & Garfunkel's second album, Sounds of Silence, although Al Gorgoni and/or Vinnie Bell feature on the title track.

Billy Joe Royal recorded five South songs: "Down in the Boondocks" (also covered in 1969 by Penny DeHaven), "I Knew You When" (later a hit for Donny Osmond, and Linda Ronstadt), "Yo-Yo" (later a hit for The Osmonds), "Hush" (later a U.S. No. 4 hit for Deep Purple, "Somebody's Image" which featured Russell Morris who later re-recorded the song with his band the Rubes, and U.K. No. 2 for Kula Shaker), and "Rose Garden", a country and pop hit for singer Lynn Anderson (see below).

Responding to late 1960s issues, South's style changed radically, most evident in his biggest single, 1969's pungent, no-nonsense "Games People Play" (purportedly inspired by Eric Berne's book of the same name), a hit on both sides of the Atlantic. Accompanied by a lush string sound, an organ, and brass, the production won the Grammy Award for Best Contemporary Song and the Grammy Award for Song of the Year. South followed up with "Birds of a Feather" (originally "Bubbled Under" at No. 106 on February 10–17, 1968, more successful as a cover by The Raiders that peaked on the Hot 100 at No. 23 on October 23–30, 1971) and two other soul-searchers, the back-to-nature "Don't It Make You Want to Go Home" (also covered eight months later by Brook Benton With The Dixie Flyers) and the socially provocative "Walk a Mile in My Shoes" (also covered by Elvis Presley in a Las Vegas era version, Jerry Lee Lewis, Bryan Ferry, and Coldcut).

South's most commercially successful composition was Lynn Anderson's 1970–1971 country–pop hit song "Rose Garden", which was a hit in 16 countries worldwide. Anderson won a Grammy Award for her vocals, and South earned two Grammy nominations for it, as Best Country Song and (general) Song of the Year. South wrote more hits for Anderson, such as "How Can I Unlove You" (Billboard Country No. 1) and "Fool Me" (Billboard Country No. 3). Freddy Weller, Jeannie C. Riley, and Penny DeHaven also had hits on the Billboard country chart with South songs. In addition, other artists who have recorded South-penned songs include Jerry Lee Lewis, Johnny Cash, Glen Campbell, Bobby Goldsboro, Loretta Lynn, Carol Burnett, Andy Williams, Kitty Wells, Dottie West, Jim Nabors, Arlen Roth, Liz Anderson, The Georgia Satellites, Waylon Jennings, Dolly Parton, Ike & Tina Turner, Hank Williams Jr., James Taylor, the Tams, Manfred Mann, the Love Affair, the Tremeloes, and k. d. lang, although most covered versions of South's best known songs.

== Personal life ==
The 1971 suicide of South's brother, Tommy, resulted in him becoming clinically depressed. Tommy South had been the drummer in Joe's backing band and accompanied Joe not only in live performances but also on recording sessions when he produced hits for other artists, including Royal, Sandy Posey, and Friend and Lover.

In an interview with Amy Duncan of Christian Science Monitor, South said, "I didn't see myself doing [drugs] for the kicks. I did it more or less to keep going, and to tap into inspiration. I equated the chemicals with the inspiration." South's drug use resulted in a surly attitude toward audiences, and he left Capitol after two unsuccessful albums. South lived for a time in the 1970s on the Hawaiian island of Maui. He said, "I really kicked myself around for years. [...] One of the main hang-ups was I just refused to forgive myself. You know, you can go through drug treatment centers, and it's not a permanent healing until it's a spiritual healing."

In 1987, South married his second wife, Jan Tant. South said this marriage helped turn things around, and Tant's inspiration helped him return to writing songs and occasional appearances in public. South fathered one child, son Craig South, who is a voice-over artist in Southern California.

== Honors ==
South won two Grammy Awards, for Song of the Year and Best Contemporary Song, for the single "Games People Play", in 1969. South was inducted into the Nashville Songwriters Hall of Fame in 1979 and became a member of the Georgia Music Hall of Fame in 1981.

In 1988, a Dutch DJ, Jan Donkers, interviewed South for VPRO-radio. The radio show that aired the interview also played four new songs by South, but a new record was not released.

On September 13, 2003, South performed during the Georgia Music Hall of Fame induction ceremony and played with Buddy Buie, James B. Cobb Jr., and Chips Moman.

South's final recording, "Oprah Cried", was made in 2009 and released as a bonus track on the 2010 re-release of the albums So the Seeds are Growing and A Look Inside on a CD collection combining both LPs for Australian label Raven Records.

South was inducted into the Musicians Hall of Fame and Museum in 2019.

== Death ==
South died at his home in Flowery Branch, Georgia, northeast of Atlanta, on September 5, 2012, of a heart attack. He was 72 years old. South and second wife Jan Tant, who had died in 1999, are buried in Mount Harmony Memorial Gardens Cemetery, in Mableton (Cobb County), Georgia.

== Discography ==
=== Albums ===
Year	Album	Chart Positions				Label
Year	Album	US	US Country	AUS	CAN	Label
1968	Introspect	117	—	—	—	Capitol
1969	Games People Play	—	—	—	—	Capitol
1969	Don't It Make You Want to Go Home?	60	39	10	36	Capitol
1970	Greatest Hits	125	—	—	88	Capitol
1971	Joe South	207	—	—	—	Capitol
1971	Joe South Story	—	—	—	—	MGM
1971	So the Seeds Are Growing	—	—	—	—	Capitol
1972	A Look Inside	—	—	—	—	Capitol
1975	Midnight Rainbows	—	—	—	—	Island
1976	You're the Reason	—	—	—	—	Gusto
1990	The Best of Joe South	—	—	—	—	Rhino
1999	Retrospect: The Best of Joe South	—	—	—	—	Koch
2001	Anthology: A Mirror of His Mind	—	—	—	—	Raven
2002	Classic Masters	—	—	—	—	Capitol

=== Singles ===
Year	Single	Chart Positions								Album(s)
Year	Single	US	US Country	US AC	AUS	CAN	CAN Country	CAN AC	UK	Album(s)
1958	"The Purple People Eater Meets the Witch Doctor"	47	—	—	—	—	—	—	—	singles only
1961	"You're the Reason"	87	16	—	—	—	—	—	—	singles only
1968	"Birds of a Feather"	106	—	—	—	—	—	—	—	Introspect
1969	"Games People Play"	12	—	—	—	7	—	—	6	Introspect, Games People Play
1969	"Birds of a Feather"	96	—	—	—	—	—	—	—	Introspect
1969	"Leaning on You"	104	—	—	—	69	—	—	—	single only
1969	"Don't It Make You Want to Go Home" (with The Believers)	41	27	16	14	42	11	18	—	Don't It Make You Want to Go Home?
1970	"Walk a Mile in My Shoes" (with The Believers)	12	56	3	20	10	6	2	—	Don't It Make You Want to Go Home?
1970	"Children"	51	—	32	41	33	—	31	—	Don't It Make You Want to Go Home?
1970	"Why Does a Man Do What He Has to Do"	118	—	—	—	47	—	—	—	Joe South
1971	"Fool Me"	78	—	—	—	—	—	—	—	Joe South

== Collaborations ==
With Aretha Franklin

- Aretha Arrives (Atlantic Records, 1967)
- Lady Soul (Atlantic Records, 1968)

With Simon & Garfunkel

- Sounds of Silence (Columbia Records, 1966)
- Parsley, Sage, Rosemary and Thyme (Columbia Records, 1966)

With Bob Dylan

- Blonde On Blonde (Columbia Records, 1966)
