= Don't It Make You Want to Go Home? =

Studio album by Joe South
- Released: 1969
- Genre: Country soul
- Label: Capitol
- Producer: Joe South

Joe South chronology
Games People Play (1969)	Don't It Make You Want to Go Home? (1969)	Greatest Hits (1970)

Don't It Make You Want to Go Home? is the third album by the American musician Joe South, released in 1969. The title track and "Walk a Mile in My Shoes" were released as singles. The album peaked at No. 60 on the Billboard 200. It was reissued in 2004.

== Production ==
Recorded at his Atlanta home studio, the album was written and produced by South. South's brother Tommy played drums on the tracks. The title track is about suburban sprawl in the Southern United States. "A Million Miles Away" is an instrumental, aside from mixed-down voices.

== Critical reception ==
Professional ratings
Review scores
Source	Rating
AllMusic	4.5/5 stars
The Encyclopedia of Popular Music	3/5 stars

The Plain Dealer said that South "is not only original, he is versatile, swinging from a poignant 'Bittersweet' to a gospelly rousing 'Shelter'". The Cincinnati Enquirer stated that South "is articulate and totally honest." The Sun opined, "The hip gospel of Joe South is beautiful and South is supremely talented." The Sunday Express and News praised the "perspective and honesty" of the lyrics. The Detroit Free Press called South "country-soul's most inventive spokesman". The Chicago Sun-Times noted that the "lyrics are rough-hewn and ... take on more life than the most artfully contrived progressive pop pretentious profundities." The Philadelphia Inquirer conceded that much of the material "is rather drab, but South's refreshing style—kind of sophisticated down-home—does more for the songs than they deserve." The Los Angeles Times said that "some of the music is remarkably personal and effective."

== Track listing ==
Side 1

1. "Clock Up on the Wall"
2. "Bittersweet"
3. "Shelter"
4. "What Makes Lovers Hurt One Another?"
5. "Before It's Too Late"

Side 2

1. "Children"
2. "Walk a Mile in My Shoes"
3. "Be a Believer"
4. "A Million Miles Away"
5. "Don't It Make You Want to Go Home"
