= My Boy =

Single by Elvis Presley

"My Boy" (1973) is a popular song from the early 1970s. The music was composed by Jean-Pierre Bourtayre and Claude François, and the lyrics were translated from the original version "Parce que je t'aime, mon enfant" (Because I Love You My Child) into English by Phil Coulter and Bill Martin.

== Song meaning ==
A sentimental ballad, the song is sung in a first-person narrative from the point of view of a father to his young son under the presumption that the child is asleep and can’t hear what his father is trying to tell him. The father tells his son the truth of the strained relationship between the child's parents, and that all the father has left is the love of his son. Rather than risk losing that through a painful divorce, the father makes the decision to stay in a loveless marriage for the sake of his child.

== Richard Harris version ==
Actor Richard Harris performed the song "My Boy" at a music contest sponsored by Radio Luxembourg in 1971. Despite not winning the contest, Harris recorded the song and released it as a single later that year. Appearing on Harris' album of the same name, the song reached No. 41 on the Billboard pop chart and peaked at No. 13 on the Billboard adult contemporary chart.

== Elvis Presley version ==
"My Boy"

Single by Elvis Presley

from the album Good Times
- B-side: "Thinking About You"; "Loving Arms" (in France)
- Released: 8 November 1974
- Recorded: 13 December 1973
- Studio: Stax Studios, Memphis
- Genre: Soft rock
- Length: 3:19
- Label: RCA Victor
- Songwriters: Phil Coulter and Bill Martin (words, English); Jean-Pierre Bourtayre and Claude François (music)
- Producer: Felton Jarvis

Elvis Presley singles chronology
"It's Midnight" / "Promised Land" (1974)	"My Boy" / "Thinking About You" (1974)	"T-R-O-U-B-L-E" (1975)

Elvis Presley recorded a cover version of "My Boy" in late 1973 that was included on his 1974 album Good Times. Presley's version of the song reached No. 20 on the Billboard pop chart and No. 17 on Cash Box. In the UK, where Presley's career had had something of a resurgence in the previous few years, it made the top 10 peaking at number 5 in the first week of January 1975. It was a bigger adult contemporary hit, spending one week atop the U.S. and Canadian charts in April 1975. "My Boy also peaked at No. 14 on the Billboard country chart.

== Charts ==
=== Richard Harris version ===
Chart (1972)	Peak position
Australian (Kent Music Report)	28
US Billboard Hot 100	41

=== Elvis Presley version ===
Chart (1974–1975)	Peak position
Australia (Kent Music Report)	10
Belgium	5
Canada RPM Adult Contemporary	1
Canada RPM Top Singles	27
Ireland (IRMA)	4
Netherlands	9
New Zealand (RIANZ)	12
UK Singles (Official Charts)	5
US Billboard Hot 100	20
US Billboard Adult Contemporary	1
US Billboard Country	14
US Cash Box Top 100	17

=== Year-end charts ===
Year-end chart performance for "My Boy" by Elvis Presley
Chart (1975)	Peak position
Australia (Kent Music Report)	65

== See also ==
- List of number-one adult contemporary singles of 1975 (U.S.)
