= You Never Can Tell (song) =

1964 single by Chuck Berry

- US single picture sleeve

Single by Chuck Berry

from the album St. Louis to Liverpool
- B-side: "Brenda Lee"
- Released: August 1964
- Recorded: January 1964
- Studio: Chess (Chicago)
- Genre: Rock and roll; rhythm and blues
- Length: 2:43
- Label: Chess
- Songwriter: Chuck Berry
- Producers: Leonard Chess; Philip Chess

Chuck Berry singles chronology
"No Particular Place to Go" (1964)	"You Never Can Tell" (1964)	"Promised Land" (1964)

"You Never Can Tell", also known as "C'est La Vie" or "Teenage Wedding", is a song written by Chuck Berry. It was composed in the early 1960s while Berry was in federal prison for violating the Mann Act. Released in 1964 on the album St. Louis to Liverpool and the follow-up single to Berry's final Top Ten hit of the 1960s: "No Particular Place to Go", "You Never Can Tell" reached number 14, becoming Berry's final Top 40 hit until "My Ding-a-Ling", a number 1 in October 1972. The song performed slightly better in Canada, and also reached the Top 40 in the United Kingdom. In June 2026, CBS News included the song in its list of the 250 essential American songs of the past 250 years, one of three Berry songs to make the list, along with "Maybellene" and "Johnny B. Goode".

Berry's recording features an iconic piano hook played by Johnnie Johnson.

== Description ==
The song tells of the wedding of two teenagers and their lifestyle afterward. Living in a modest apartment furnished with items bought on sale at Sears, Roebuck, and Co., including a Coolerator brand refrigerator, the young man finds work and they begin to enjoy relative prosperity. Eventually, they purchase a "souped-up jitney" (Note: In the early years of the 20th century, many Ford Model T owners in the US and Canada used their vehicles to provide a regulated or unregulated share taxi or illegal taxi operation. As a result, the Model T was often colloquially known at that time as a "jitney". Our heroes' vehicle, "a souped-up jitney, 'twas a cherry red '53", is possibly an elderly Model T hot rod.) and travel to New Orleans, where their wedding had taken place, to celebrate their anniversary. Each verse ends with the refrain, "'C'est la vie,' say the old folks, 'it goes to show you never can tell.'" The piano melody was influenced by Mitchell Torok's 1953 hit "Caribbean".

Cash Box described it as "a rock-a-rhythmic South of the Border-flavored item [Berry] dishes up beautifully."

=== Chart performance ===
Chart (1964)	Peak position
Australia (Kent Music Report)	18
Canada (CHUM Hit Parade)	13
UK Singles (The Official Charts Company)	26
US Billboard Hot 100	14

== Certifications ==
Region	Certification	Certified units/sales
Italy (FIMI)	Gold	50,000^{‡}
New Zealand (RMNZ)	Gold	15,000^{‡}
Spain (Promusicae)	Platinum	60,000^{‡}
United Kingdom (BPI)	Gold	400,000^{‡}
^{‡} Sales+streaming figures based on certification alone.

== Other versions ==
=== Emmylou Harris version ===
"You Never Can Tell (C'est La Vie)"

Single by Emmylou Harris

from the album Luxury Liner
- B-side: "You're Supposed to Be Feeling Good" (USA/Canada) "Hello Stranger" (international)
- Released: February 2, 1977
- Genre: Country rock, rockabilly
- Length: 3:27
- Label: Warner Bros. Nashville
- Songwriter: Chuck Berry
- Producer: Brian Ahern

Emmylou Harris singles chronology
"Light of the Stable" (1976)	"You Never Can Tell (C'est La Vie)" (1977)	"Making Believe" (1977)

Emmylou Harris' recording of "You Never Can Tell" - entitled "(You Never Can Tell) C'est La Vie" - was the lead single from her 1977 Warner Bros. Records album Luxury Liner. The recording was a Top Ten C&W hit.

Harris had sung Chuck Berry songs as a member of a DC-based folk trio early in her career. Her decision to record "...C'est La Vie" was the result of her listening extensively to rock-&-roll oldies while on the road. The track, which features a prominent Cajun fiddle contribution by Ricky Skaggs, was recorded in an August 10, 1976 session recorded in the Enactron Truck, the mobile studio owned and operated by Harris' producer Brian Ahern. The same session yielded "Hello Stranger" which would serve as the B-side of the single release.

Released February 2, 1977, "...C'est La Vie" rose as high as #6 on C&W chart in Billboard that April. The track also rose to #4 and #5, respectively in the Netherlands and also the Flemish Region of Belgium. It also charted in Germany at #41.

In a 2013 interview Harris said: "'C’est la Vie' was a wonderful song to do, and I might [perform] it for nostalgic reasons, but it just lost its appeal for me after a while. I didn’t feel that I was bringing anything to it, I guess."

=== Also ===
- 1975 John Prine, on Common Sense.
- 1975 Loggins and Messina, on So Fine.
- 1980 Daddy Cool, on The Missing Masters.
- 1993 Aaron Neville, on The Grand Tour.
- 1994 Bob Seger, on Greatest Hits (as "C'est La Vie").
- 2017 Coldplay, on A Concert for Charlottesville.
- 2019 Jerry Garcia Band, on Electric on the Eel.

The song has also been recorded or performed by Chely Wright, New Riders of the Purple Sage, the Jerry Garcia Band, Bruce Springsteen, the Mavericks, and Buster Shuffle.

== Pulp Fiction ==
External videos
- Pulp Fiction - Dance Scene on YouTube

The song became popular again after the 1994 release of the film Pulp Fiction, directed and co-written by Quentin Tarantino. The music was played for a "Twist contest" in which Vincent Vega (John Travolta) and Mia Wallace (Uma Thurman) competed (and were the only contestants shown in the film). The music added an evocative element of sound to the narrative and Tarantino said that the song's lyrics of "Pierre" and "Mademoiselle" gave the scene a "uniquely '50s French New Wave dance sequence feel".

== In other media ==
- Emmylou Harris performed the song live on stage on June 20, 1977, it can be seen on the TopPop YouTube channel,
- The Pelicans also covered it on stage on their own YouTube channel.
- The song was also going to be part of the tracklist for dance video game Just Dance 2015, but was removed for an unknown reason. It later returned on its sequel Just Dance 2016 instead.
- In a season 10 episode of The Big Bang Theory, Leonard dances to the song in his underwear after he and Penny have their apartment to themselves for the first time when Sheldon moves out.
