= Promised Land (Chuck Berry song) =

Song lyric written by Chuck Berry to the melody of "Wabash Cannonball"

Single by Chuck Berry

from the album St. Louis to Liverpool
- B-side: "Things I Used to Do"
- Released: December 1964
- Recorded: February 1964
- Studio: Chess (Chicago)
- Genre: Rock and roll
- Length: 2:24
- Label: Chess
- Songwriter: Chuck Berry
- Producers: Leonard Chess, Philip Chess

Chuck Berry singles chronology
"Little Marie" (1964)	"Promised Land" (1964)	"Dear Dad" (1964)

"Promised Land" is a song lyric written by Chuck Berry to the melody of "Wabash Cannonball", an American folk song. The song was first recorded in this version by Berry in 1964 for his album St. Louis to Liverpool. Released in December 1964, it was Berry's fourth single issued following his prison term for a Mann Act conviction. The record peaked at number 41 in the Billboard charts on January 16, 1965.

== Background ==
Berry wrote the song while in prison, and borrowed an atlas from the prison library to plot the itinerary. In the lyrics, the singer (who refers to himself as "the poor boy") tells of his journey from Norfolk, Virginia, to the "Promised Land", Los Angeles, California, mentioning various cities in Southern states that he passes through on his journey. Describing himself as a "poor boy", the protagonist boards a Greyhound bus in Norfolk, Virginia, that passes Raleigh, N.C., stops in Charlotte, North Carolina, and bypasses Rock Hill, South Carolina. The bus rolls out of Atlanta, but breaks down, leaving him stranded in downtown Birmingham, Alabama. He then takes a train "across Mississippi clean" to New Orleans. From there, he goes to Houston, where "the people there who care a bit about me" buy him a silk suit, luggage, and a plane ticket to Los Angeles, while flying over Albuquerque. Upon landing in Los Angeles, he calls Norfolk, Virginia ("TIdewater four, ten-oh-nine" (TIdewater 4-1009)) to tell the folks back home he made it to the "promised land". The lyric: "Swing low, sweet chariot, come down easy/Taxi to the terminal zone" refers to the gospel lyric: "Swing low, sweet Chariot, coming for to carry me Home" since both refer to a common destination, "The Promised Land", which in this case is California, reportedly a heaven on earth.

Billboard called the song a "true blue Berry rocker with plenty of get up and go", adding that "rinky piano and wailing Berry electric guitar fills all in neatly". Cash Box described it as "a 'pull-out-all-the-stops' rocker that Chuck pounds out solid sales authority" and "a real mover that should head out for hit territory in no time flat." In 2021, it was listed at No. 342 on Rolling Stone's "Top 500 Greatest Songs of All Time".

=== Chart history ===
Chart (1964–65)	Peak position
Canada RPM Top Singles	30
UK	26
U.S. Billboard Hot 100	41
U.S. Billboard R&B	41
U.S. Cash Box Top 100	35

== Elvis Presley version ==
"Promised Land"

Single by Elvis Presley

from the album Promised Land
- B-side: "It’s Midnight"
- Released: September 27, 1974
- Recorded: December 15–16, 1973
- Studio: Stax Studios, Memphis, TN
- Genre: Country; country rock; rock and roll
- Length: 2:54
- Label: RCA Victor
- Songwriter: Chuck Berry
- Producer: Felton Jarvis

Elvis Presley singles chronology
"If You Talk in Your Sleep" / "Help Me" (1974)	"Promised Land" / "It's Midnight" (1974)	"My Boy" / "Thinking About You" (1975)

In December 1973, Elvis Presley covered Berry's song. Presley's version of "Promised Land" was released as a single on September 27, 1974. It peaked at number 14 on the Billboard Hot 100 chart, and 9 on the UK Singles Chart in the fall of 1974. It was included on his 1975 album Promised Land. The Presley version was used in the soundtrack of the 1997 motion picture Men in Black.

=== Chart history ===
Chart (1974–75)	Peak position
Canada RPM Top Singles	19
France	25
Ireland (IRMA)	7
UK Singles (OCC)	9
Spain	25
U.S. Billboard Hot 100	14
U.S. Cash Box Top 100	22

=== Personnel ===
- Elvis Presley – lead vocals, harmony vocals
- James Burton – lead guitar
- Johnny Christopher — rhythm guitar
- Charlie Hodge – acoustic rhythm guitar
- Norbert Putnam – bass
- David Briggs – piano, organ; overdubbed tambourine
- Per Eric “Pete” Hallin – clavinet
- Ronnie Tutt – drums
- Randy Cullers – overdubbed cowbell

== Other versions ==
There are numerous other versions of this song:

- In 1964 Johnny Rivers released his live album In Action including this song..
- In 1970 Freddy Weller released a version on an album of the same name. It was a Top 5 country hit in the winter of 1971.
- The Grateful Dead notably performed the song live 425 times from July 1971 through the band's last show in 1995; live performances appear on nearly 50 of the band's live albums, including the 1976 United Artists released live album Steal Your Face as well as several of the band's Dick's Picks releases.
- In 1971 Johnnie Allan released a Cajun version in the US. It was released in 1974 in the UK.
- In 1971 Dave Edmunds included it on his album Rockpile, released also as a single in 1972, it reached number five in the Australian charts.
- In 1972 the band Juicy Lucy recorded a version on their album Pieces.
- In 1973 the Canadian-American rock group The Band recorded "Promised Land" for their sixth studio LP, Moondog Matinee.
- In 1974 James Taylor recorded a version on his album Walking Man.
- In 1977 it was recorded by country singer Billy "Crash" Craddock on his album Live!.
- In 1983 Meat Loaf recorded the song for his Midnight at the Lost and Found album.
- In 1984 The Black Sorrows recorded a version for their debut studio album, Sonola.
- In 1984 Mike Read released a cover version but set in and near London. The song was mentioned in the documentary Embarrassing 80s.
- In 2007 Geno Delafose released a zydeco version on his album Le Cowboy Creole.
- In 2009 W.A.S.P. recorded a version of this song on the album Babylon.
- In 2014 Harry Dean Stanton released a version on the soundtrack album for the documentary film about him, Partly Fiction.
- In 2014 Jerry Lee Lewis released a version of this song on his album Rock & Roll Time
- 1995 - John Greene, Gone West

In 1966 Baby Ray Eddlemon recorded his version of Promised Land on his debut record Where Soul Lives

== Johnny Hallyday version (in French) ==
"La Terre promise"

Single by Johnny Hallyday

from the album La Terre promise
- Language: French
- B-side: "La Premiere Fois"
- Released: September 5, 1975
- Recorded: Spring–summer 1975
- Genre: Blues rock, country rock
- Length: 2:34
- Label: Philips
- Songwriters: Chuck Berry, Michel Mallory
- Producers: Lee Hallyday, Shelby Singleton

Johnny Hallyday singles chronology
"La Fille de l'été dernier" (1975)	"La Terre promise" (1975)	"Requiem pour un fou" (1976)

Music video
- "La Terre promise" (INA archive, 1975) on YouTube

The song was covered in French by Johnny Hallyday, using an adaptation of Presley's arrangement (Hallyday is commonly referred to as the French version of Presley for his contributions to rock and roll in France). His version (titled "La Terre promise") was released in September 1975 for his twentieth studio album of the same name (which would be released four days after the single) and spent one week at no. 1 on the singles sales chart in France (from November 1 to 7, 1975). The single is backed by "La Premiere Fois" ("The first time").

=== Charts ===
Chart (1975)	Peak position
France (singles sales)	1
