= Love Affair =

A love affair is a form of romantic relationship.

Love Affair may also refer to:

== Films ==
- Love Affair (1932 film), starring Dorothy Mackaill and Humphrey Bogart
- Love Affair (1939 film), starring Irene Dunne and Charles Boyer
- Love Affair, or the Case of the Missing Switchboard Operator, a 1967 Yugoslav film
- Love Affair (1994 film), featuring Annette Bening, Warren Beatty and Katharine Hepburn
- The Love Affair (film), a 2015 Filipino film
- Love Affair(s), a 2020 French film
- Love Affair (unreleased film), an unreleased Indian film

== Music ==
- Love Affair (band), an English pop and soul band, formed in 1966
- Love Affair, a 1992 album by Gloria Gaynor
- Love Affair (album), a 1996 album by Amii Stewart
- "Love Affair", the B-side of Sal Mineo's 1957 song "Start Movin' (In My Direction)"
- "Love Affair", a song by Toni Braxton from the 1993 album Toni Braxton
- "Love Affair", a song by Kylie Minogue from the 2001 album Fever
- "Love Affair", a song by Moka Only from his 2011 album Airport 5
- Hercules and Love Affair, a dance music project

== Other uses ==
- A Love Affair (Italian: Un amore), a 1963 novel by Dino Buzzati
