= Walk a Mile in My Shoes =

"Walk A Mile In My Shoes"

Single by Joe South and the Believers

from the album Don't It Make You Want to Go Home?
- B-side: "Shelter"
- Released: January 1970
- Recorded: 1969, Atlanta, GA
- Length: 3:42
- Label: Capitol 2704
- Songwriter: Joe South
- Producer: Joe South

Joe South and the Believers singles chronology
"Don't It Make You Want to Go Home" (1969)	"Walk A Mile In My Shoes" (1970)	"Children" (1970)

"Walk a Mile in My Shoes" is a song written by Joe South from his album Don't It Make You Want to Go Home?, who had a hit with it in 1970. South was also producer and arranger of the track and of its B-side, "Shelter." The single was credited to "Joe South and the Believers"; the Believers included his brother Tommy South and his sister-in-law Barbara South.

It peaked at number 12 on both the Billboard Hot 100 and Cash Box singles charts. It was South's second and final record to reach the top 20 of the Hot 100. It reached highs of No. 56 on the Billboard country chart and No. 3 on its Easy Listening chart. In Canada, it peaked at No. 10 on the RPM singles chart. It also reached the top 20 in Australia. In June 2026, CBS News included the song in its list of the 250 essential American songs of the past 250 years.

== Background ==
The song concerns racial tolerance and the need for perspective and compassion.

== Charts ==
=== Weekly charts ===
Chart (1970)	Peak position
Australia (Kent Music Report)	20
Canada RPM Top Singles	10
Canada RPM Adult Contemporary	2
Canada RPM Country	6
U.S. Billboard Hot 100	12
U.S. Billboard Easy Listening	3
U.S. Billboard Country	56
U.S. Cash Box Top 100	12
U.S. Record World Top 100	11

=== Year-end charts ===
Chart (1970)	Rank
Australia	154
U.S. Cash Box	95

== Notable covers and references ==
- Elvis Presley, on his 1970 live album On Stage. In June 2026, CBS News included the Presley rendition in its list of the 250 essential American songs of the past 250 years.
- Willie Hightower, as a single in 1970 (also included on the Honest Jon's 2004 compilation album simply titled Willie Hightower), originally produced by Rick Hall at FAME Studios in Muscle Shoals, Alabama.
- Harry Belafonte and Lena Horne as part of an hour-long television special Harry & Lena.
- Cliff Waldron, on his 1970 bluegrass album Right On.
- Bob Andy, in a 1970 reggae cover.
- Ray Stevens, on his 1970 album Everything Is Beautiful.
- Billy Eckstine, on his 1971 album Feel the Warm.
- Marion Montgomery, on her 1972 album Marion in the Morning.
- Jerry Lee Lewis, on his 1972 album The Killer Rocks On.
- People's Temple Choir, on their 1973 album He's Able.
- Bryan Ferry, on his 1974 album Another Time, Another Place.
- De Dijk, on their 2002 album Muzikanten dansen niet (Dutch version of the song).
- Greg Page, included in his 2004 Nashville concert.
- Coldcut, on their 2006 album Sound Mirrors, featuring vocals from Robert Owens.
- Otis Clay, on his 2007 album Walk a Mile in My Shoes.
- Kentucky Headhunters, on their 2011 album Midnight Special.
- Lake Street Dive, as part of a 2020 Ad Council campaign encouraging a more welcoming nation.
