= 2014 WBPF World Championship =

International fitness competition

6th WBPF World Championship in Bodybuilding and Fitness
- 2014

Tournament information
- Sport: Bodybuilding / Fitness
- Location: Mumbai, India
- Dates: 5 December–10th, 2014
- Venue: Bombay Exhibition Centre

Final positions
- Champions: Thailand (men/women)

Tournament statistics
- Overall Winner: Peter Molnar, (Hungary)
- Most medals won: India (20)

The 6th WBPF World Championship was a major international competition in bodybuilding and fitness, as governed by the World Bodybuilding and Physique Federation (WBPF). It took place in Bombay Exhibition Centre, Mumbai, India from 5–10 December 2014. More than 300 contestants from 33 countries participated in the championship.

The competition was covered by several TV stations and WBPF TV covered the news via Facebook for readers to watch the competition live.

This event was organized by IBBF led by President Baba Madhok, Secretary-General Chetan Pathare and their Organizing Chairman led by Madhukar Talwalkar and Organizing Secretary Vikaram Rothe and the Organizing Committee of this event.

This championship was preceded by 2013 WBPF World Championship held in Budaors, Hungary and succeeded by 2015 WBPF World Championship held in Bangkok, Thailand.

== Host announcement ==
On 17 August 2014 World Bodybuilding and Physique Sports Federation (WBPF) made an official announcement on their website that 6th WBPF World Championship will be held in Mumbai, India, from 5–10 December 2014.

Datuk Paul Chua, Secretary General of WBPF confirmed this decision after inspection meeting with Indian government and sports officials.

== Nations participants ==
More than 300 contestants from 33 countries participated in 6th edition of the championship. There were competitors from all continents except North America.

21.6% of all contestants were women.

Country		Participants			Country		Participants		
Country		Men	Women	Total	Country		Men	Women	Total
(Afghanistan)	Afghanistan	13	-	13	(Malaysia)	Malaysia	8	1	9
(Albania)	Albania	-	1	1	(Mongolia)	Mongolia	6	3	9
(Austria)	Austria	3	-	3	(Myanmar)	Myanmar	1	-	1
(Belgium)	Belgium	1	1	2	(Nepal)	Nepal	4	-	4
(Bhutan)	Bhutan	2	3	5	(New Caledonia)	New Caledonia	2	1	3
(Brazil)	Brazil	11	3	14	(Palestine)	Palestine	1	-	1
(Egypt)	Egypt	1	-	1	(Papua New Guinea)	Papua New Guinea	1	-	1
(Hong Kong)	Hong Kong	2	3	5	(Serbia)	Serbia	3	1	4
(Hungary)	Hungary	11	7	18	(Singapore)	Singapore	2	2	4
(India)	India (host nation)	77	12	89	(Slovakia)	Slovakia	-	1	1
(Iran)	Iran	42	-	42	(Tajikistan)	Tajikistan	2	-	2
(Iraq)	Iraq	3	-	3	(Thailand)	Thailand	15	10	25
(Italy)	Italy	3	1	4	(Ukraine)	Ukraine	3	10	13
(Japan)	Japan	1	-	1	(United Arab Emirates)	United Arab Emirates	1	-	1
(Jordan)	Jordan	9	-	9	(Uzbekistan)	Uzbekistan	4	-	4
(Kazakhstan)	Kazakhstan	1	3	4	(Vietnam)	Vietnam	3	3	6
(Macau)	Macau	3	-	3					
Total of 305 contestants (239 men, 66 women) from 33 countries.

== Official results ==
The organizer of the championship, Indian Bodybuilding Federation (IBBF) has published official results in January 2015.

=== Overall winners ===
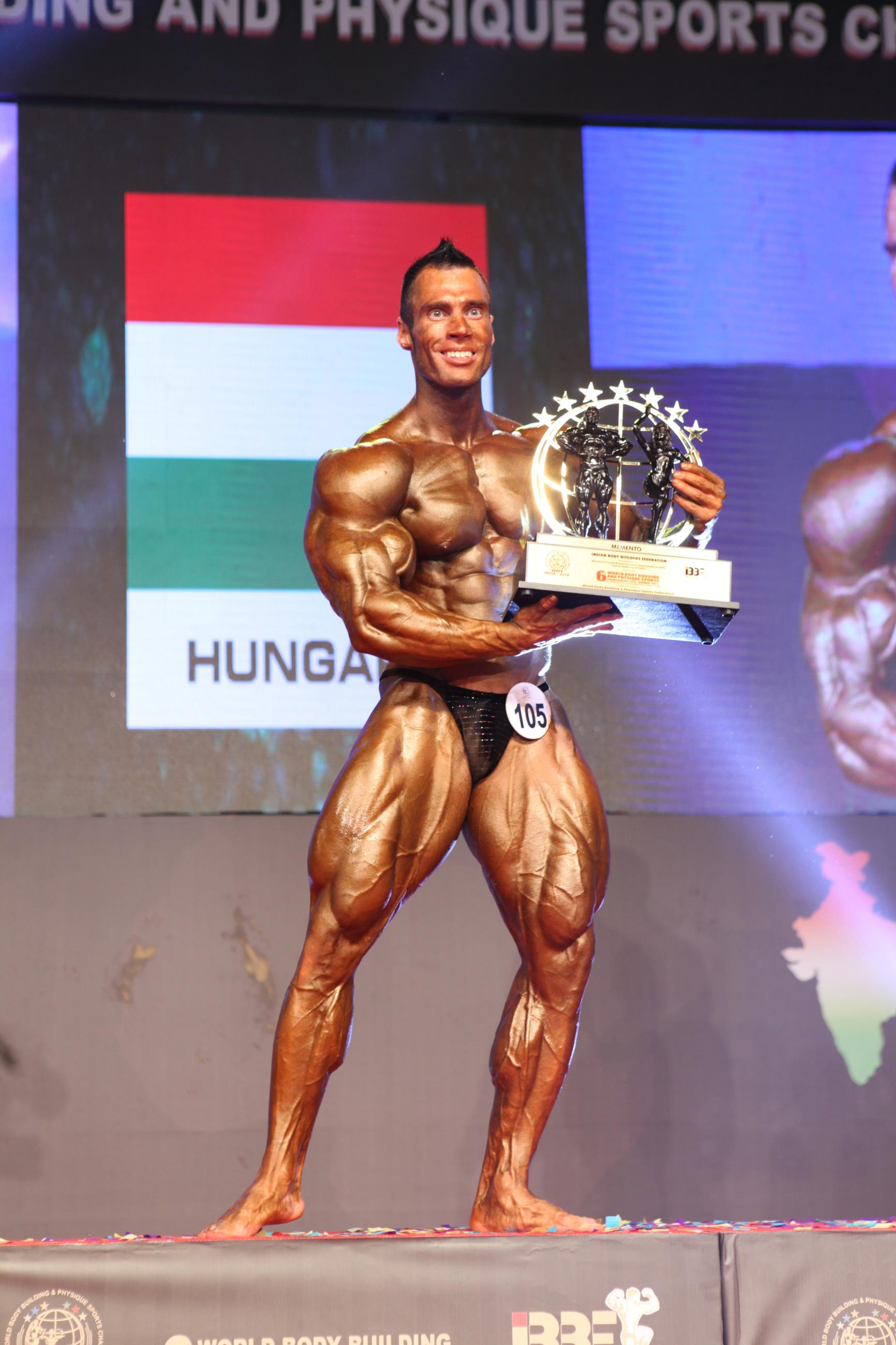
Peter Molnar Overall winner at 6th WBPF World Championship in Mumbai India (December 10th, 2014)

Individual overall winner is Peter Molnar of Hungary who won gold medal in Bodybuilding (100 kg) category. Team overall winner in both, men's and women's competition is national team of Thailand who won 8 gold, 5 silver and 5 bronze medals, the most among participants.

INDIVIDUAL OVERALL WINNER
Peter Molnar
( Hungary)

TEAM OVERALL WINNER
Thailand
18 medals (8 gold, 5 silver, 5 bronze)

=== Master 40-49 yrs (up to 80kg) ===
Standings
Gold	Somkhit Sumethowetchakun	Thailand
Silver	Buda Anak Anchah	Malaysia
Bronze	Mohamad Ghasmi	Iran
4th	Vachara Sasrisank	Thailand
5th	Azahar Bin Mahamad	Malaysia
6th	Bogaty Mihaly Arpad	Hungary
7th	Heinz Weindl	Austria
8th	Kangjam Dineshchandra	India
8th	Balaphrang Kharshiing	India
10th	Dipankar Saikia	India
11th	Omar Basheer Ali Qwaider	Jordan

=== Master 40-49 yrs (over 80kg) ===
Standings
Gold	Juns Nurlan	Mongolia
Silver	Miguel Fiho	Brazil
Bronze	Mohsen Abbaspourtorbati	Iran
4th	Ahmad Naji Hasan Alsa'Afeen	Jordan
5th	Viraj Sarmalkar	India
6th	Khezrollah Rezaei	Iran
7th	Seyyedmorteza	Iran
8th	Mohammad Salehinezamabadi	Iran
9th	Fernando Sardinha	Brazil
10th	Seyed Mostafa Mousavi Reyneh	Iran
11th	Mohayan Bin Rosmaini	Malaysia
11th	Andrelino Batista De Freitas	Brazil
13th	Kairat Syzdykov	Kazakhstan
14th	Kelemen Zoltan	Hungary
15th	Mohamed Saeed	United Arab Emirates
16th	Donald Kaiwi	Papua New Guinea
17th	Ashish Kumar Upadhyaya	India

=== Master 50-60 yrs ===
Standings
Gold	Sakorn Mahtwangsang	Thailand
Silver	Pala Meechai	Thailand
Bronze	Mohammad Azam Akram Zada	Afghanistan
4th	Peter Joseph Gnalian	India
5th	Hioshi Yoshikawa	Japan
6th	Cicolella Luca	Italy
7th	Shahmohammadian Mohammad	Iran
8th	Dollah Bin Ja'afar	Singapore
9th	Amin Fahmi Shaker Abid	Palestine
10th	Levantino Enrico	Italy
11th	Anup Mukherjee	India

=== Master Over 60 yrs ===
Standings
Gold	Nando Luwang Yendrembam	India
Silver	Rajendra Kumar Saxena	India
Bronze	Shirmohammad Dadmohammadi	Iran

=== Women's Fitness Physique (up to 160cm) ===
Standings
Gold	Kooseenam Nongyao	Thailand
Silver	Kliuchnikova Anastasilia	Ukraine
Bronze	Tram Thi Cam Tu	Vietnam
4th	Krisztina Fuzi	Hungary
5th	Ajaree Tansub	Thailand
6th	Ashwini Waskar	India
7th	Soniya Mitra	India

=== Women's Fitness Physique (over 160cm) ===
Standings
Gold	Roongtawan Jindasing	Thailand
Silver	Nikola Krčová	Slovakia
Bronze	Shweta Rathore	India
4th	Shreyashi Das Chowdhury	India
5th	Ankita Singh	India

=== Men's Fitness Physique (up to 170cm) ===
Standings
Gold	Wanchai Kanjanapimine	Thailand
Silver	Mousa Esmaeilpour	Iran
Bronze	Wong Chong Leong	Macau
4th	Samsher Ali	India
5th	Santosh Kumar Rai	India

=== Men's Fitness Physique (over 170cm) ===
Standings
Gold	Damrongsak Soisri	Thailand
Silver	Baltav Khuseltuvshin	Mongolia
Bronze	Jirawat Trakoolma	Thailand
4th	Sangay Tsheltrim	Bhutan
5th	Miladarab	Iran
6th	Mustafa Ahmed	India
7th	Junaid Kaliwala	India
8th	Gaurav Kumar	India
9th	Hau Kin Man	Hong Kong
10th	Rohit Oberoi	India

=== Men's Sport Physique (up to 170cm) ===
Standings
Gold	Nilesh Bombie	India
Silver	Bimal Lai Shrestha	Nepal
Bronze	Milhier Singh	India
4th	Ryan Cannell	India
5th	Wanchai Kanjanapimine	Thailand
6th	Yim Ka Wai Gary	Hong Kong

=== Men's Sport Physique (up to 180cm) ===
Standings
Gold	Andras Horvath	Hungary
Silver	Mišel Lozanić	Serbia
Bronze	Vigh Domonkos	Hungary
4th	Ranjeet Singh	India
5th	Junaid Kaliwala	India
6th	Harinder S.Sekhon	India
7th	Sajed Zeyad Hussein Abukhalaf	Jordan
8th	Baltav Khuseltuvshin	Mongolia
9th	Anil Sati	India
10th	Jirawat Trakoolma	Thailand
11th	Damrongsak Soisri	Thailand
12th	Mohd.Shail	India
13th	Anil Rahmati	Afghanistan
14th	Chetan Sharma	India
15th	Hosseini Someah Mohammad Reza	Iran
16th	Batatin Oleksandr	Ukraine
16th	Juliano Rodrigues	Brazil
16th	Mohamad Yoones	Afghanistan
16th	Arjun Kapoor	India

=== Men's Sport Physique (over 180cm) ===
Standings
Gold	Bogar Janos	Hungary
Silver	Junior Lima	Brazil
Bronze	Amir Zandi	Iran
4th	Thongsng Kittakoraa	Thailand
5th	Omid Zandiyeh	Iran
6th	Konstantin Vasiljević	Serbia
7th	Savio Chavan	India
7th	Gaurav Kumar	India

=== Men's Junior (up to 70kg) ===
Standings
Gold	Seyedmobin Karimifrouzkouhi	Iran
Silver	Goran Othman Ahmed Ahmed	Iraq
Bronze	Rahul Ulhas Doiphode	India
4th	Baryalai Ahadi	Afghanistan

=== Men's Junior (over 70kg) ===
Standings
Gold	Volinkin Mikhail Viktorovich	Uzbekistan
Silver	Seyedmahyar Tabadkari	Iran
Bronze	Apichai Wandee	Thailand
4th	Mohebali Shahriyar	Iran
5th	Oryaa Khil Mohammad Nabi	Afghanistan
6th	Shougrakpam Bungcha Singh	India
7th	Nagesh Gajanan Sutar	India
8th	Panzeri Victor Raj	Italy

=== Women's Athletic Physique (up to 165cm) ===
Standings
Gold	Palecian Judit	Hungary
Silver	Kliuchnikova Anastasila	Ukraine
Bronze	Roongtawan Jindasing	Thailand
4th	Vertegel Olga	Ukraine
5th	Sokol Larysa	Ukraine
6th	Synelnykova Hanna	Ukraine
7th	Kooseenam Nongyao	Thailand
8th	Karuna Waghmare	India
9th	Priscila Alves	Brazil
10th	Galsan Gansaruul	Mongolia
11th	Luong Hong Ngoc	Vietnam
12th	Ho On Nor Anna Christianne	Hong Kong
13th	Ankita Singh	India

=== Women's Athletic Physique (over 165cm) ===
Standings
Gold	Nur Farina Binte M J Ismail	Singapore
Silver	Virpinie Delugre ep. Foucault	(France)
Bronze	Nagy Bettina	Hungary

=== Men's Athletic Physique (up to 170 + 4kg) ===
Standings
Gold	Kittiphong Chansuwan	Thailand
Silver	Galbadrakh Jamts	Mongolia
Bronze	Mohd Syarulazman Mahen Bin Abdullah	Malaysia
4th	Khuntan Phuangphet	Thailand
5th	Wong Chong Leong	Macau
6th	Parintorn Salathong	Thailand
7th	Vahid Karimiasli	Iran
8th	Rosemberg Santos	Brazil
9th	Motaz Hafez	Egypt
10th	Dustov Firdavs	Tajikistan
10th	Abdul Habib Bostanzada	Afghanistan
12th	Jovan Milošević	Serbia
13th	Lam Keng Hou	Macau

=== Men's Athletic Physique (up to 180 + 6kg) ===
Standings
Gold	Kamramn Salehi	Iran
Silver	Gilbert Foucault	France
Bronze	Orlando Gomes	Brazil
4th	Farajishiviari Hamid	Iran
5th	Nabajit Kumar Das	India
6th	Ali Mousavian	Iran
7th	Sajad Heidari Chegeni	Iran
7th	Hamed Mandi	Iran
9th	Olim Abdurasulov	Tajikistan
10th	Attila Kincses	Hungary
11th	Melvyn Fichter	New Caledonia
12th	Mohammad Ayub	Afghanistan
13th	Kabeer Singh Diddan	India
14th	Munish Kumar	India
14th	Nizamov Khamid Alimovich	Uzbekistan
15th	Guradesh Mann	India
16th	Miladarab	Iran
16th	Siddhant Rajendra Jaiswal	India
16th	Mustafa Ahmed	India
16th	Pema Thekchok	Bhutan
16th	Sangay Tsheltrim	Bhutan
16th	Mohamed Faris Bin Mohamed Said	Singapore
16th	Hrechaniuk Anton	Ukraine

=== Men's Athletic Physique (over 180 + 8kg) ===
Standings
Gold	Hassanbeigi Ardestani Hamidreza	Iran
Silver	Zyma Sergi	Ukraine
Bronze	Ali Shams Ghamar	Iran
4th	Krizsan Attila	Hungary
5th	Ghobad Abdi	Iran
6th	Ahmad Issam Abdo Alhamawi	Jordan
7th	Ricardo Barguine	Brazil
8th	Kuong Tat Fong	Macau
9th	Raghav Sharma	India

=== Women's Model Physique (up to 160cm) ===
Standings
Gold	Daniya Tieumbetova	Kazakhstan
Silver	Lartym Viktorila	Ukraine
Bronze	Fuzi Krisztina	Hungary
4th	Evelyn Dirocie	Belgium
5th	Tran Thi Cam Tu	Vietnam
6th	Nontanutda Ammart	Thailand
7th	Varych Kateryna	Ukraine
7th	Sansalmaa Nasanbuyan	Mongolia
9th	Gaywalin Grant	Thailand
10th	Camila Oliveira	Brazil
11th	Lo Billie Yee Ping	Hong Kong
12th	Vatika Ahluwalia Grover	India
13th	Soniya Mitra	India

=== Women's Model Physique (up to 165cm) ===
Standings
Gold	Lengyei Vivien Nikolett	Hungary
Silver	Meszaros Rafaella Emese	Hungary
Bronze	Wanwisa Sangkrim	Thailand
4th	Tikhorenko Olga	Kazakhstan
5th	Bayarsaikhan Oyungerel	Mongolia
6th	Duanchay Sivamoklakana	Thailand
7th	Hrechaniuk Nataliia	Ukraine
8th	Nikola Krčová	Slovakia
8th	Eranda Shuaipi	Albania
10th	Mak Pui Yin	Hong Kong
11th	Shweta Rathore	India
12th	Jinnie Gogia Chugh	India
13th	Tshering Cheki	Bhutan

=== Women's Model Physique (up to 170cm) ===
Standings
Gold	Krukovska Anna	Ukraine
Silver	Regos Lili Rita	Hungary
Bronze	Makambaeva Gulmira	Kazakhstan
4th	Jelena Đukić	Serbia
5th	Yeatoeh Lhamo Penjore	Bhutan
6th	Danyliuk Maryna	Ukraine
7th	Farina Jessiza	Italy

=== Women's Model Physique (over 170cm) ===
Standings
Gold	Georgina Simko	Hungary
Silver	Olga Labunskaia	Ukraine
Bronze	Benjawan Thongsin	Thailand
4th	Kinley Wangmo	Bhutan

=== Women's Bodybuilding (up to 55kg) ===
Standings
Gold	Suhami Binte Mohammad	Singapore
Silver	Wilaiporn Wannnaklang	Thailand
Bronze	Nguyen Thi My Linh	Vietnam
4th	Sibalika Saha	India
5th	Eudésia Martins	Brazil
6th	Sarita Devi Thingbaijam	India

=== Women's Bodybuilding (over 55kg) ===
Standings
Gold	Tan Li Lian	Malaysia
Silver	Jaranya Doungkum	Thailand
Bronze	Rebita Kongbrailatpan	India
4th	Mamota Devi Yumnam	India

=== Men's Bodybuilding (up to 55kg) ===
Standings
Gold	Pham Van Mach	Vietnam
Silver	Nitin Prakash Mhatre	India
Bronze	Chuluunbazar Myanganbileg	Mongolia
4th	Arundas CV	India
5th	Amit Mehta	India
6th	Rujesh Shahi	Nepal
7th	Soleymannezhad Hossein	Iran

=== Men's Bodybuilding (up to 60kg) ===
Standings
Gold	Jiraphan Pongkam	Thailand
Silver	Nguyen Anh Thong	Vietnam
Bronze	Swapnil Nanwadkar	India
4th	Ram Hari Khanal	Nepal
5th	Indranil Maity	India
6th	Anoop Raju	India
7th	Tun Min	Myanmar
8th	Muhamad Roszaimi Bin Abd. Rani	Malaysia

=== Men's Bodybuilding (up to 65kg) ===
Standings
Gold	Nguyen Van Lam	Vietnam
Silver	Shiv Kumar	India
Bronze	Raju Khan	India
4th	Somkhit Sumethowetchakun	Thailand
5th	Vachara Sasrisank	Thailand
6th	Jayakumar S	India
7th	Romi Singh	India
8th	Lodonbaa Saruulbat	Mongolia
9th	Attila Ocsko	Hungary
9th	Malvern Bin Abdullah	Malaysia
11th	Rostamikordmahaleh	Iran

=== Men's Bodybuilding (up to 70kg) ===
Standings
Gold	B. Maheswaran	India
Silver	Wichai Singthong	Thailand
Bronze	Anil Gochhikar	India
4th	Neeraj Kumar	India
5th	Buda Anak Anchah	Malaysia
6th	Anas Hussain	India
7th	Agahianzabi Hashem	Iran
8th	Maheswar Maharjan	Nepal
9th	Sushil Kumar	India
10th	Gansukh Dorj	Mongolia
11th	Pankaj Pratihari	India
12th	Rami Abdulraheem Ahmad Abufardeh	Jordan

=== Men's Bodybuilding (up to 75kg) ===
Standings
Gold	Sazali Bin Abd Samad	Malaysia
Silver	Abbas Salari	Iran
Bronze	Arambam Boby Singh	India
4th	Yatinder Singh	India
5th	Moirangthem Robi Meitei	India
6th	Sagar Katurde	India
7th	P Tamilanban	India
8th	Ramin Hassanzada	Afghanistan
9th	Vinit Marwaha	India
10th	Elyas Mahak	Afghanistan

=== Men's Bodybuilding (up to 80kg) ===
Standings
Gold	Sawaeng Panapoi	Thailand
Silver	Vipin Peter	India
Bronze	Sunit Jadhav	India
4th	Vijay Bahadur	India
5th	Marcio Vieira Gonçalves	Brazil
6th	Azahar Bin Mahamad	Malaysia
7th	Mohammadjaber Zare	Iran
7th	Mousa Esmaeilpour	Iran
9th	Mohammad Bakhtiari	Iran
9th	Mohammad Osman Anwary	Austria
11th	Pala Meechai	Thailand
12th	Ashish Narendra Sakharkar	India
13th	Hamidullah Sherzai	Afghanistan
14th	Nabil Athman	Austria
15th	Omar Abdulbari	Iraq
16th	Heinz Weindl	Austria
16th	Hiroshi Yoshikawa	Japan
16th	Mohammad Ashraf	India

=== Men's Bodybuilding (up to 85kg) ===
Standings
Gold	Sangram Chougule	India
Silver	Panupong Prateep	Thailand
Bronze	Juns Nurlan	Mongolia
4th	Rahul Bisht	India
5th	Pashikyan Armen Genrikovich	Uzbekistan
6th	Balint Kaszas	Hungary
7th	Pourya Kamani	Iran
8th	Ghobadi Saeid	Iran
9th	Babak Abolghaseai	Iran
10th	Hassan Jan Sakhi	Afghanistan
11th	Mohayan Bin Rosmaini	Malaysia
12th	Donald Kaiwi	Papua New Guinea

=== Men's Bodybuilding (up to 90kg) ===
Standings
Gold	Alirea Sarlak	Iran
Silver	Jagdish Lad	India
Bronze	Ram Niwas	India
4th	Sagar Pramod Mali	India
5th	Poursales Mohammadreza	Iran
6th	Sahebazzamani Alireza	Iran
7th	Mohsen Abbaspourtorbati	Iran
8th	Jagat Kumar	India
9th	Sagar Jadhav	India
10th	Umurzakov Pavel Petrovich	Uzbekistan
11th	Apichai Wandee	Thailand
12th	Amr Khaled Wasfi Al-Amleh	Jordan
13th	Ameer Saeb	Iraq
14th	Fernando Sardinha	Brazil
15th	Kiran Patil	India
16th	Mohamed Saeed	United Arab Emirates
16th	Khair Mohammad Ahmad Zai	Afghanistan

=== Men's Bodybuilding (up to 100kg) ===
Standings
Gold	Peter Molnar (Overall winner)	Hungary
Silver	Ehab Ahmad Yahya Qweider	Jordan
Bronze	Mohammad Haroon Azami	Afghanistan
4th	Siyamak Porkhosravi	Iran
5th	Vikram	India
6th	Khezrollah Rezaei	Iran
7th	Javed Alikhan	India
8th	Bruno Divino Neto	Brazil
9th	Satyajit Pratihari	India
10th	Deepak Tripathi	India
11th	Parveen Kumar	India
12th	Gamesh	India
13th	Seyed Mostafa Mousavi Reyneh	Iran
14th	Sohrab Eghbaliyoun	Iran

=== Men's Bodybuilding (over 100kg) ===
Standings
Gold	Mahmoud Kafi	Iran
Silver	Hari Prasad	India
Bronze	Nagy Hunor Szabolcs	Hungary
4th	Ali Ejlali	Iran
5th	Miguel Filho	Brazil
6th	Seyyedmorteza	Iran
7th	Atarod Parviz	Iran
8th	Winnelinckx Aron Charel Theresa	Belgium
9th	Qasem Omar Qasem Haimour	Jordan
10th	Prema Chandran Dharmarajan	India
11th	Andrelino Batista De Freitas	Brazil
12th	Ali Mohammad Ahmed Abdallah	Jordan

== Medals table by nation ==
Participants from 20 countries were among the winners. Most medals won national team of India (twenty), most gold medals have been awarded to Thailand's contestants (eight). There were total of 102 medals awarded in 34 categories (medals of overall winners aren't included).

#	Country	1st place, gold medalist(s)	2nd place, silver medalist(s)	3rd place, bronze medalist(s)	Total
1.	Thailand	8	5	5	18
2.	Hungary	6	2	4	12
3.	Iran	5	3	5	13
4.	India	4	6	10	20
5.	Malaysia	3	1	1	5
6.	Vietnam	2	1	2	5
7.	Singapore	2	-	-	2
8.	Ukraine	1	5	-	6
9.	Mongolia	1	2	2	5
10.	Kazakhstan	1	-	1	2
11.	Uzbekistan	1	-	-	1
12.	Brazil	-	2	1	3
13.	France	-	2	-	2
14.	Iraq	-	1	-	1
14.	Jordan	-	1	-	1
14.	Nepal	-	1	-	1
14.	Serbia	-	1	-	1
14.	Slovakia	-	1	-	1
19.	Afghanistan	-	-	2	2
20.	Macau	-	-	1	1
