= Jagdish Lad =

Indian bodybuilder (1987–2021)

Personal information
- Nationality: Indian
- Born: 1987 Kundal Palus, Sangli
- Died: 30 April 2021 (aged 34) Ahmedabad

Sport
- Country: India
- Sport: Bodybuilding
Medal record
Representing India
men's Bodybuilding
WBPF World Championship
Silver medal – second place	2014 Mumbai	up to 90kg 2015 Bangkok

Jagdish Lad (1987 – 30 April 2021) was an Indian bodybuilder. He had represented India and Maharashtra at several bodybuilding competitions.

== Biography ==
Jagdish Lad was born and raised in Kundal village in the district of Sangli. He later moved to Navi Mumbai. However, he subsequently settled in Ahmedabad in order to manage a local gym.

== Career ==
Lad claimed a silver medal in the men's category of up to 90 kg during the 2014 & 2015 WBPF World Championship which was held in Mumbai, Bangkok. He also claimed a silver medal at Mr. India bodybuilding competition and also won the national Bharat Shri title. He retired from professional bodybuilding in 2018.

== Death ==
Lad died on 30 April 2021, from COVID-19 at the age of 34. He was kept under oxygen support at a private hospital in Ahmedabad. He was also the second competitive Indian bodybuilder to die due to COVID-19 after Manoj Lakhan, a 30–32 year old who died the previous week. It was revealed that Jagdish faced financial issues during the lockdown imposed due to the COVID-19 pandemic in India.
