= Mišel Lozanić =

- Professional bodybuilder

Personal info
- Born: September 11, 1990 (age 35); Zrenjanin Serbia

Best statistics
- Height: 177 cm (5 ft 10 in)
- Weight: 102 kg (225 lb)

Professional (Pro) career
- Pro-debut: WBPF Multisports International, Novi Sad, Serbia; November 2, 2014
- Best win: IBFA and WABBA World Champion, NAC Mr. Universe (silver medalist); 2016
- Active: yes

Mišel Lozanić (Serbian Cyrillic: Мишел Лозанић) (born September 11, 1990) is a Serbian professional fitness and bodybuilding competitor, fitness model and personal trainer. Lozanić is competing under IFBB federation and he's member of IFBB Professional League. He's first (and to date only) Serbian professional in Men's Physique category.

He has won a two World championships: he was placed first at the WABBA World championship in 2016 in Verona, Italy and at the IBFA World championship in 2016 in Rome, Italy. He is a WBPF European champion. Since 2014, he has been the Serbian WBPF national champion. Lozanic also placed at WBPF World championships in 2014 in Mumbai, India and in 2015 in Bangkok, Thailand. Lozanić is now competing under IFBB.

== Early and personal life ==
Lozanić was born in Zrenjanin, Serbia and grew up in Vojvoda Stepa. He was educated at the primary school in Vojvoda Stepa village. Lozanic attended the technical high school in Kikinda. He was an undergraduate of the Faculty for Ecology and Environment Protection at the Union University, Belgrade. Lozanic has undertaken postgraduate studies at a University of Natural Medicine. Before beginning a professional fitness career, Mišel tried various sports such as karate, crossfit, marathon, bodybuilding and team sports.

Since March 20, 2023 he is married to Leah Lozanić (née Hosse; born in 1996). He and Leah have one child, a boy Maksim Veselin, born in March 17, 2024 (announced on multiple Lozanić's verified social profiles).

Currently living and working in Gainesville, Florida, United States.

== Professional career ==
Lozanic began his career in 2014. On November 2, 2014, he won his maiden title (WBPF Multisports International) in Novi Sad, Serbia. One week later, on November 8, 2014, Lozanic placed third at the Austrian WBPF in Vienna, Austria. From December 5 to 10, 2014, Lozanic competed at the WBPF World Championship competition in where he placed second. In 2015, Lozanic defended his Serbian title and came first in Austria in the WBPF competitions. At the 7th WBPF World Championship in Bangkok he came second. In 2016, Lozanic appeared at eight competitions and won six gold and two silver medals. He competed at tournaments organized under four different federations (IFBB, WABBA, IBFA, NAC and WBPF). He placed first at the WABBA and IBFA World championships and second at the NAC Mr. Universe competition in Hamburg. At the 8th WBPF World championship in Pattaya, Lozanic did not compete but was an official promoter and sport ambassador. In between competitions, Lozanic worked as personal trainer in Dubai, United Arab Emirates. Lozanić's fame in Serbia stems from his success after growing up in a small village.

Since 2017. Mišel Lozanić is member of IFBB.

== Contest history ==
2014:

- WBPF Multisports International, Novi Sad, Serbia - Gold
- WBPF International coupe, Vienna, Austria – Bronze
- WBPF World Championship, Mumbai, India - Silver

2015:

- WBPF Serbian championship, Niš, Serbia - Gold
- WBPF International coupe, Vienna, Austria – Gold
- WBPF World Championship, Bangkok, Thailand - Silver

2016:

- WBPF International coupe, Vienna, Austria – Gold
- WBPF European championship, Budapest, Hungary - Gold
- Coupe Mom Beach Games, Budapest, Hungary - Gold
- Scitec Nutrition Superbody, Budapest, Hungary - Silver
- WBPF Serbian championship, Novi Sad, Serbia - Gold
- WABBA World Championship, Verona, Italy - Gold
- IBFA World Championship, Rome, Italy - Gold
- NAC Mr. Universe, Hamburg, Germany - Silver

2017:

- IFBB Arnold Classic, Barcelona, Spain - semifinal
- IFBB Memorial cup "Novica Pauljicic", Bor, Serbia - Gold
- IFBB The trophy of Cacak, Čačak, Serbia - Gold
- IFBB FitPass-Belgrade open Belgrade, Serbia - Gold
- IFBB Serbian bodybuilding and fitness championship Belgrade, Serbia - Gold

2018:

- IFBB International Cup of Serbia, Novi Pazar, Serbia - Gold (04/28/2018)
- IFBB Diamond Cup, Serbia 2018, Čačak, Serbia - Gold (05/11-14/2018)
- 27th Balkan Championships 2018, Drobeta-Turnu Severin, Romania - Gold (05/19-20/2018)

2019:

- IFBB II Open Balkan Cup, Knjaževac, Serbia - Gold (06/28-30/2019)

2021:

- NPC Ruby Championships, Boca Raton, Florida, United States - Gold (+Overall) (10/30/2021)
- NPC Klash Series All South Championships, Orlando, Florida, United States - Gold (+Overall) (11/6/2021)
- NPC Monsta Classic, Lake City, Florida, United States - Gold (+Overall) (11/13/2021)
- NPC Atlantic Coast Championships, Fort Lauderdale, Florida, United States - Gold (+Overall) (11/20/2021)
- NPC Mel Chancey Holiday Classic, Tampa, Florida, United States - Gold (12/4/2021)

2022:

- Caribbean Grand Prix, Hamilton, Bermuda, United Kingdom - Gold +PRO CARD (3/26/2022)

== Medals ==
Competition type	1st place, gold medalist(s)	2nd place, silver medalist(s)	3rd place, bronze medalist(s)	Total
World Championships	2	2	0	4
Grand Prix	1	0	0	1
Mr. Universe	0	1	0	1
European Championships	1	0	0	1
Other competitions	19	1	1	21
Total	23	4	1	28

== Other sports ==
Lozanic was a successful junior sportsman in a number of disciplines. As a youth, he played football, basketball, volleyball and handball. He has also competed in the Belgrade Marathon.

Karate (junior):

- (Serbia) Championship of Central Banat, 2004 – Gold
- (Serbia) Championship of Vojvodina, 2004 – Silver

Crossfit:

- (Serbia) Championship "Ninja warriors", Ada Ciganlija, Belgrade, 2013 – Gold
- Championship of Serbia, Belgrade, 2013 – Bronze

Bodybuilding:

- (Serbia) Championship of Vojvodina, Elemir, 2014 – Gold
- Championship of Serbia, Pancevo, 2014 – Bronze
