= Farkhod Bakhriev =

Uzbekistani bodybuilder

- ♂ Professional bodybuilder

Personal info
- Born: April 10, 1987 (age 38)

Best statistics
- Height: 170 cm (5 ft 7 in)
- Weight: Contest: 90 kg (198 lb); Off season 105 kg (231 lb)

Professional (Pro) career
- Best win: 2021
- Predecessor: Pavel Umurzakov

Competition record

BodyBuilding

International achievements
1st	2021	WBPF World Championship
3rd	2022	WBPF World Championship

Farkhod Bakhriev (uzb: Farhod Bahriev: ru: Фарход Бахриев) is an Uzbek amateur bodybuilder, gold medalist of 2021 WBPF World Championship in the men's bodybuilding up to 85 kg category and bronze medalist of the 2022 World Bodybuilding Federation World Championship that took place in Phuket, Thailand in the same weight category.

== Biography ==
Bakhriev was born on April 10, 1987, in Bukhara, Uzbekistan. In 2006, he started bodybuilding, and in 2017, he began to participate in bodybuilding tournaments. In 2017, he won his first tournament at the Uzbekistan Open Championship in Bukhara, finishing third in the men's 75 kg category. In 2022, he became world champion at the 2021 WBPF World Championship in the 85 kg men's category and in 2022, he won a silver medal in the 13th WBPF World Bodybuilding and Physique Sports Championship 2022 in Phuket.

== Anthropometry ==
- Height: 5 ft 7 in (170 cm)
- Off season weight: 100–105 kg
- Competition weight: 85–90 kg
- Upper arm size: 50–5 2 cm
- Chest: 52in 30 cm
- Thigh size: 75 cm
- Waist size: 85 cm
- Calf size: 46 cm

== Contest history ==
Pavel Umurzakov in Bodybuilding Competitions and results
Year	Competition	Place	Result
2017	Uzbekistan Open Championship	Uzbekistan	3rd
2017	Jizzakh Open Championship	Uzbekistan	2nd
2017	1st Bukhara Open Championship	Uzbekistan	1st
2018	Central Asian Championship	Kazakhstan	4th
2018	Uzbekistan Open Championship	Uzbekistan	3rd
2018	Generation Iron Show	Uzbekistan	3st
2020	Uzbekistan Cup and Proform Fitness Festival	Uzbekistan	1st
2021	Navoiy OPen Championship	Uzbekistan	1st
2021	12th WBPF World Bodybuilding and Physique Sports Championship	Uzbekistan	1st
2022	Uzbekistan Championships	Uzbekistan	1st
2022	54th Asian Bodybuilding & Physique Sports Championships	Maldives	4th
2022	13th WBPF World Bodybuilding and Physique Sports Championship	Thailand	3rd
