= Olesya Gureeva =

Professional strongwoman (born 1980)

- ♀ professional bodybuilder
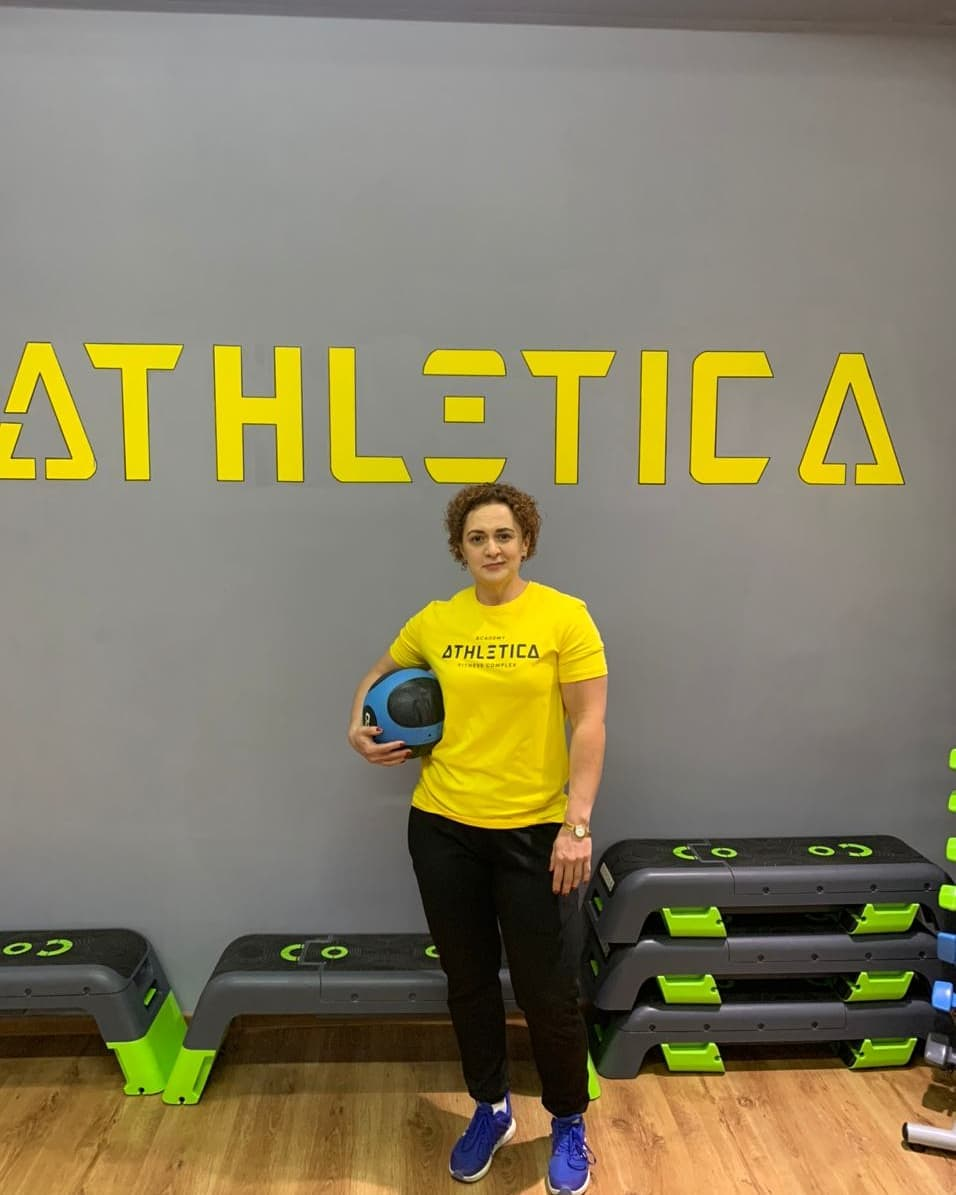

Personal info
- Born: May 14, 1980 (age 44); Uzbekistan USSR

Best statistics
- Height: Contest: 85 kg Off season: 85 kg

Professional (Pro) career
- Pro-debut: Mas Wrestling World Championship; 2014
- Best win: Arnold Sports Festival (gold); 2022
- Predecessor: Guljahon Turdikulova
- Active: since 2014

Olesya Gureeva (uzb: Olesya Gureyeva Cyrillic: Гуреева Олеся born 1980) is an Uzbekistani mass wrestling, powerlifting strongwoman and bodybuilder. Gureeva is the first female winner of Arnold Sports festivals and Mass Wrestling absolute World Champion 2017, 2018 and 2022 OHIO, Columbus from Central Asia.

== Biography ==
Gureeva started her strongwoman career in 2012, by participating in the National Championships of Uzbekistan. Her first international tournier was I Mas-Wrestling World Championship that held in Russia. In 2017 and 2018 in a row from 22 participants, 9 countries she won Gold medal of Mas-Wrestling World Absolute Championship, at Arnold Sports Festival in Columbus, Ohio. After 4 years in 2022 she has repeated the same result at Arnold Classic International MAS Wrestling Championship, in Coolumbus, Ohio and gained Gold of Championships. Gureeva is a 3x (2016, 2019, 2022) silver medalist and 2x bronze medalist (2014, 2018) of World Championships.

== Anthropometry ==
- Height:
- Off Season Weight: 85 kg
- Competition Weight: 85 kg

== Competitions ==
Olesya Gureeva in Mass Wrestling Competitions and results
Year	Competition	Place	Result
2022	Arnold Classic International MAS Wrestling Championship	USA, OHIO	1st
2022	IV World Mas-Wrestling Championship	Russia	2nd
2019	Mas-Wrestling World Cup	Uzbekistan	2nd
2018	Arnold Classic International MAS Wrestling Championship	USA, OHIO	1st
2018	III Mas-Wrestling World Championship	Russia	3rd
2017	Arnold Sportsl World Absolute Championship (absolute champion)	USA, OHIO	1st
2017	Asian Powerlifting Championships	Indonesia	2nd
2017	AsianPF Asian Powerlifting Championships	India	2nd
2016	II Mas-Wrestling World Championship	Kyrgyzstan	2nd
2016	World Nomad Games	Kyrgyzstan	2nd
2015	Asia-Oceania Raw Championships powerlifting	Uzbekistan	2nd
2014	I Mas-Wrestling World Championship	Russia	3rd

== Family ==
Gureeva is married to Pavel Umurzakov and she has two daughters.

== See also ==
Mas-wrestling
