= Mikhail Volinkin =

Professional bodybuilder

- ♂ Professional bodybuilder
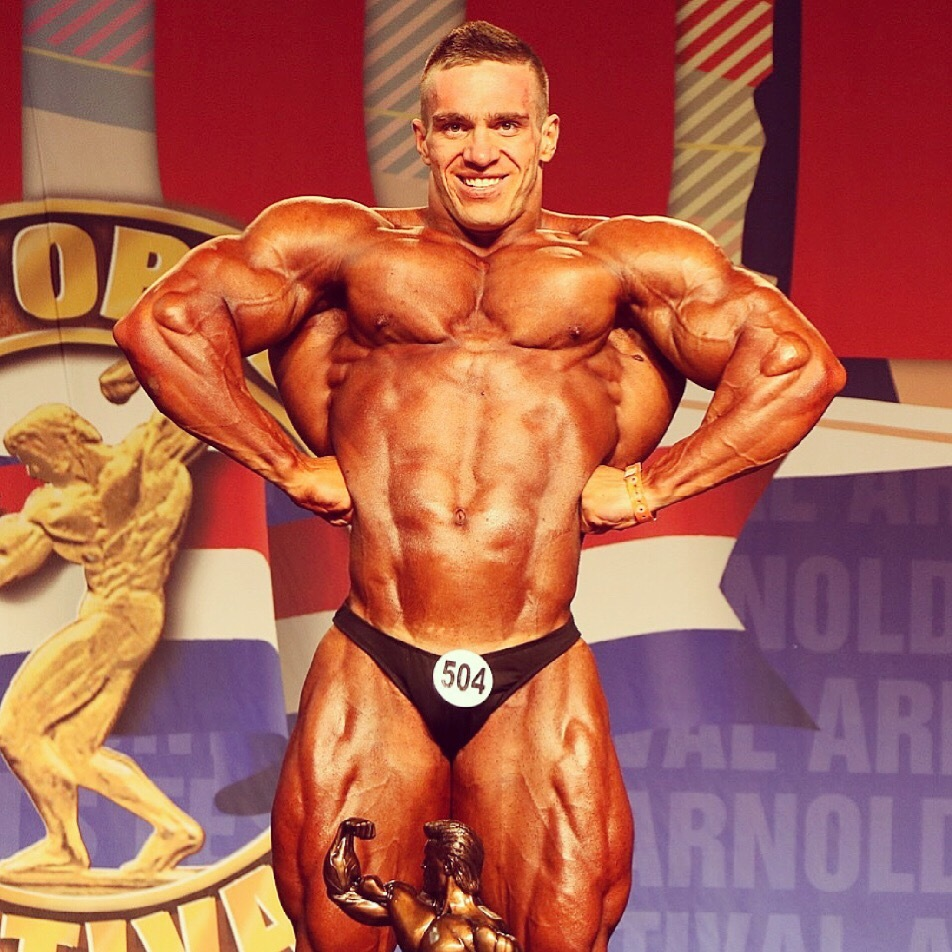

Personal info
- Born: February 1, 1994 (age 32); Novgorod, Russia

Best statistics
- Height: 171 cm 5ft 7in
- Weight: Contest: 110 kg 242 lb Off season 123 kg 271 lb

Professional (Pro) career
- Pro-debut: 2019 Arnold Classic Monsterzym Pro
- Best win: IFBB Pro Arnold Classic; 2019
- Active: Yes

Mikhail Volinkin (uzb: Mixail Volinkin, ru:Михаил Волынкин born February 1, 1994) is an Uzbekistani first IFBB professional bodybuilder and winner of Arnold Amateur Classics 2018 overall in heavyweight category.

== Early life ==
When he was four years old, his family moved to Tashkent, Uzbekistan. His family left him and he grew up in an orphanage. He has always been devoted to sports. When he was young he started training in taekwandoo, kickboxing and parkour.

== Bodybuilding career ==
He started his career in bodybuilding in 2012 when he became National champion of Uzbekistan two years in a row. (2012–2013). In 2013, he won his first International title at Asian Championships in Kazakhstan, Alma-Ata. The 6th WBPF World Championship was a major international competition in bodybuilding and fitness, as governed by the World Bodybuilding and Physique Federation (WBPF). It took place in Bombay Exhibition Centre, Mumbai, India More than 300 contestants from 33 countries participated in the championship. Mikhail Volinkin took 1st place on Men Junior +70 kg category. That was his first world championship title and first bodybuilder from Uzbekistan became World Champion. Next year at the 7th WBPF World Championship that hold in Thailand, Bangkok took again 1st place of Championships. His best win as amateur bodybuilder was at Arnold Amateur Classic 2018. Mikhail Volinkin won the overall Men's Bodybuilding title as more than 600 of the top amateur competitors from around the world competed in 10 divisions at the 12th Annual Arnold Amateur NPC International Championships that held in US, Ohio, Columbus

== Professional contest ==
Mikhail Volinkin earned his IFBB Pro status after a major victory at the 2018 Arnold Classic Amateur competition. He hoped to compete against the best bodybuilders in the world. He made history as the first athlete from Central Asia to win and receive an IFBB pro card. He made his professional debut at the 2019 IFBB Arnold Classic. At just 24 years old, he was the youngest competitor in the lineup standing alongside some of the sport’s top names and with his physique and hard work he always wants to impress his muscle fans and made the best impression in the bodybuilding world. Later that year, he competed in his second IFBB professional event, the 2019 Monsterzym Pro in Seoul, South Korea.

== Athlete statistics ==
• Height: 5 ft 7 in (171 cm)

• Off Season Weight: 290 pounds (130 kg)

• Competition Weight: 242 pounds (110 kg)

• Upper Arm Size: 24 in (60 cm)

• Chest: 52in (132 cm)

• Thigh Size: 29 in (78 cm)

• Waist Size: 35 in (90 cm)

• Calf Size: 20 in (51 cm)

== Bodybuilding titles ==
Amateur

Year	Competition	Place	Result
2012	Uzbekistan Open Championship	Uzbekistan	1st
2013	Uzbekistan Open Championship	Uzbekistan	1st
2013	Central Asian Championships	Kazakhstan	1st
2013	6th WBPF World Championship	India	1st
2014	7th WBPF World Championship	Thailand	1st
2015	Overall Asian Champion	Uzbekistan	1st
2016	Overall Asian Champion	Uzbekistan	1st
2016	Overall Central Asian Champion	Kazakhstan	1st
2016	Asian Championship	Bhutan	2nd
2017	Overall Champion of Uzbekistan	Uzbekistan	1st
2017	Overall Central Asian Champion	Kazakhstan	1st
2017	Asian Championship	South Korea	2nd
2017	9th WBPF World Championship	Mongolia	1st
2018	Arnold Amateur Classic (Overall Champion)	US	1st
2023	INBA PNBA Professional America's Natural & Amateur (Amateur Open Bodybuilding)	US	3rd

• Professional Career

Year	Competition	Place	Result
2019	Arnold Classic Pro	US	12th
2019	Monsterzym Pro Men's Bodybuilding	South Korea	7th
2023	Pro/Am Diana Kakos Presents International Battle Against Cancer	US	1st
