= 2021 WBPF World Championship =

12th WBPF World Championship in Bodybuilding and Fitness
- 2021

Tournament information
- Sport: Bodybuilding / Fitness
- Location: Tashkent, Uzbekistan
- Dates: 1 October–7th, 2021
- Venue: Humo Arena

The 12th WBPF World Bodybuilding and Physique Sports Championship 2021 was held on 1 to 7 October 2021 in Tashkent, Uzbekistan. From October 4 to October 6, Humo Arena hosted the XII World Bodybuilding Championship. About 350 athletes from more than 150 sports delegations took part in the three-day competition

== Official results ==
Stood out among ten finalists, Reza Nouriarsssa from Iran won the title of WBPF Mr Universe 2021. During the first and second days, participants competed in bodybuilding, as well as for the title of athlete physicist, fitness physicist, model physicist and sports physicist. On the final day of the competition, October 6, the general championship was held. All 10 men's bodybuilding champions from 55 kg to 100+kg took the stage for the last time to find out who was the overall winner of the 2021 World Champion

INDIVIDUAL OVERALL WINNER
Reza Nouriara
( Iran)

=== Men’s Bodybuilding up to 55 kg ===
Standings
Gold	Arjun Kumar Sahu	India
Silver	Mohamed Moosa	Maldives
Bronze	Mashkhurbek Numonov	Uzbekistan

=== Men’s Bodybuilding up to 60 kg ===
Standings
Gold	Chandan Kumar Sahu	India
Silver	Malvern Abdullah	Malaysia
Bronze	Pardeep Kumar Verma	India

=== Men’s Bodybuilding up to 65 kg ===
Standings
Gold	Abbas maki ali	Bahrain
Silver	Mohamed rasheed	Maldives
Bronze	Benjamin Jerold Rajendran	India

=== Men’s Bodybuilding up to 70 kg ===
Standings
Gold	Ramakrishna	India
Silver	Buda anak anchah	Malaysia
Bronze	Valeriy stoyanov	Uzbekistan

=== Men’s Bodybuilding up to 75 kg ===
Standings
Gold	Jakhongir Juraev	Uzbekistan
Silver	Kumar ganesan	India
Bronze	Reza zargar	Iran

=== Men’s Bodybuilding up to 80 kg ===
Standings
Gold	Morteza Aryayinezhad	Iran
Silver	Shahzad Ahmed qureshi	Pakistan
Bronze	Umarjon Khujanov	Uzbekistan

=== Men’s Bodybuilding up to 85 kg ===
Standings
Gold	Farkhod Bakhriev	Uzbekistan
Silver	Evgeniy chenkin	Uzbekistan
Bronze	Karthikeswar ravikumar	India

=== Men’s Bodybuilding up to 90 kg ===
Standings
Gold	Khaletskii Ruslan	Russia
Silver	Sujan Bhikaji Pilankar	India
Bronze	Chandra Pradhan	India

=== Up to 90 kg ===
Standings
Gold	KHALETSKII RUSLAN	Russia
Silver	SUJAN BHIKAJI PILANKAR	India
Bronze	RAJESH CHANDRA PRADHAN	India

=== Up to 100 kg ===
Standings
Gold	REZA NOURIARA	Iran
Silver	MOHAMMED AHMED ALMHEIRI	(United Arab Emirates) UAE
Bronze	ILESKHAM UMARALIEV	Kyrgyzstan

=== Over 100 kg ===
Standings
Gold	VITALIY SKRIPACHEV	Uzbekistan
Silver	JAVED ALIKHAN	India
Bronze	ARASH SOLTANMOHAMMADI	Canada

=== Juniors ===
Standings
Gold	SURESH BALAKUMAR	India
Silver	UMAR SHAHZAD	Pakistan
Bronze	VIGNESH ANNAMALAI	India

=== Masters 40 - 49 up to 80kg ===
Standings
Gold	ABBAS MAKI ALI	Bahrain
Silver	BUDA ANAK ANCHAH	Malaysia
Bronze	SUBHASH SHANKAR PUJARI	India

=== Over 80 kg ===
Standings
Gold	MOHAMMED AHMED ALMHEIRI	United Arab Emirates
Silver	Pavel Umurzakov	Uzbekistan
Bronze	MUBINJON MIRSAIDOV	Tajikistan

=== Masters 50 - 59 up to 80 kg ===
Standings
Gold	DULAMRAGCHAA SUGAR	Mongolia
Silver	RAJENDRAN RAGAVAN	India
Bronze	BALDEV KUMAR	India

=== Over 80 kg ===
Standings
Gold	ABDUL WAHEED	Pakistan
Silver	ISROIL TURSINOV	Uzbekistan
Bronze	HOSSEIN TAJIK	Iran

=== Men's Fitness Physique ===
Standings
Gold	MUNKH ERDENE	Mongolia
Silver	BAYANMUNKH JARGALSAIKHAN	Mongolia
Bronze	TIKHON GALAKTIONOV	Uzbekistan

=== Men's Sport Physique up to 170 cm ===
Standings
Gold	HAYIT HASANOV	Uzbekistan
Silver	DEEPAK DEEPAK	India
Bronze	AZNEEN RASHAD	Maldives

=== Up to 175 cm ===
Standings
Gold	SACHIN CHAUHAN	India
Silver	OMER SHAHID	Pakistan
Bronze	PRATIK DEB	India

=== Up to 180 cm ===
Standings
Gold	SHUKHRAT ABDALIEV	Uzbekistan
Silver	SULTAN BIN ALI	India
Bronze	ALISHER MAHMADULLOEVICH SHOEV	Russia

=== over 180 cm ===
Standings
Gold	BRORBEK IMINJANOV	Uzbekistan
Silver	MANIKANDAN RAJAGURU	India
Bronze	MAXIM KRAVTSOV	Kazakhstan

=== Men's Athletic Physique up to 167 cm ===
Standings
Gold	SUHROB GHAFFPROV	Tajikistan
Silver	JOHN MARIO RANDRIANARIMANANA	Madagascar
Bronze	MOHD SYARUL AZMAN MAHEN ABDULLAH	Malaysia

=== up to 175 cm ===
Standings
Gold	GERGO HORVATH	Hungary
Silver	MAURICE MARINJARA	Madagascar
Bronze	HUSSAIN HIMYAN	Maldives

=== up to 182 cm ===
Standings
Gold	ALI SADEGHI BAYATI	Iran
Silver	GHASEM SHENAVA	Iran
Bronze	SHAMSHOD KOBILOV	Uzbekistan

=== Over 182 cm ===
Standings
Gold	ALALI MOHAMMAD	Iran
Silver	MILAD GHADBEIKLOOEI	Iran
Bronze	HOSSEIN REZAPOUR DEZAJ	Iran

=== Women's Fitness Physique Juniors ===
Standings
Gold	BERNADETT BRIGITTA STEFAN	Hungary
Silver	BOLOR TUGSJARGAL	Mongolia

=== Open ===
Standings
Gold	BERNADETT BRIGITTA STEFAN	Hungary
Silver	BOLOR TUGSJARGAL	Mongolia
Bronze	ENKHBILEG DAMCHAA	Mongolia

=== Women's Athletic Physique Masters 30 + ===
Standings
Gold	JUDIT PALECIAN	Hungary
Silver	AGNES SZEIFFERT SZEIFFERT-TEZSLA	Hungary
Bronze	RANDRIANTAHINA EP RANDRIAMANANTENA	Madagascar

=== Open ===
Standings
Gold	JUDIT PALECIAN	Hungary
Silver	AGNES SZEIFFERT SZEIFFERT-TEZSLA	Hungary
Bronze	RANDRIANTAHINA EP RANDRIAMANANTENA	Madagascar

=== Women's Model Physique Juniors ===
Standings
Gold	EVELINA ILDAROVNA	Uzbekistan
Silver	DOROTTYA KOVACS	Hungary
Bronze	MILENA PRUDTSKIKH	Uzbekistan

=== Masters 30 + ===
Standings
Gold	BADAMKHAND DAVAASAMBUU	Mongolia
Silver	DILNOZAKHON DEKHKONOVA	Uzbekistan
Bronze	ELINA LI	Uzbekistan

=== Masters 40 + ===
Standings
Gold	OLGA KOMPANIIETS	Ukraine
Silver	OYUN-UNDRAKH ZANDANSUREN	Mongolia
Bronze	INGA TSKHAY	Uzbekistan

=== Up to 155 cm ===
Standings
Gold	EVELINA ILDAROVNA	Uzbekistan
Silver	ENKHBILEG DAMCHAA	Mongolia
Bronze	NAIRA GUKASYAN	Uzbekistan

=== Up to 160 cm ===
Standings
Gold	MILENA PRUDTSKIKH	Uzbekistan
Silver	NIGINA SALIKHOVA	Uzbekistan
Bronze	OYUN-UNDRAKH ZANDANSUREN	Mongolia

=== Up to 165 cm ===
Standings
Gold	ZSANETT PAZSAK	Hungary
Silver	DIANA MAK	Hungary
Bronze	LINA PANOVA	Kazakhstan

=== Open ===
Standings
Gold	ELENA BEKIROVA	Uzbekistan
Silver	BADAMKHAND DAVAASAMBUU	Mongolia
Bronze	DOROTTYA KOVACS	Hungary

=== Women's Sports Physique Masters 30 + ===
Standings
Gold	SARA PETHE	Hungary
Silver	YULIIA VORONA	Ukraine
Bronze	DIANA BESSONOVA	Uzbekistan

=== Open ===
Standings
Gold	SARA PETHE	Hungary
Silver	REGINA MENGNOROVA	Uzbekistan
Bronze	BOLOR TUGSJARGAL	Mongolia

=== Women's Bodybuilding Masters 30 + ===
Standings
Gold	MEILAURA DORA JIMMY	Malaysia
Silver	YASMIN AN-NIMR	Tajikistan

=== Open ===
Standings
Gold	MEILAURA DORA JIMMY	Malaysia
Silver	KARISHMA CHANU CHINGANGBAM	India
Bronze	YASMIN AN-NIMR	Tajikistan

=== Team championship men's ===
1st India (585 points)

2nd Uzbekistan (440 points)

3rd Iran (330 points)

=== Team championship women's ===
1st Hungary (515 points)

2nd Uzbekistan (425 points)

3rd Mongolia (240 points)
