= Ali Ejlali =

Iranian bodybuilder

- ♂ Professional bodybuilder
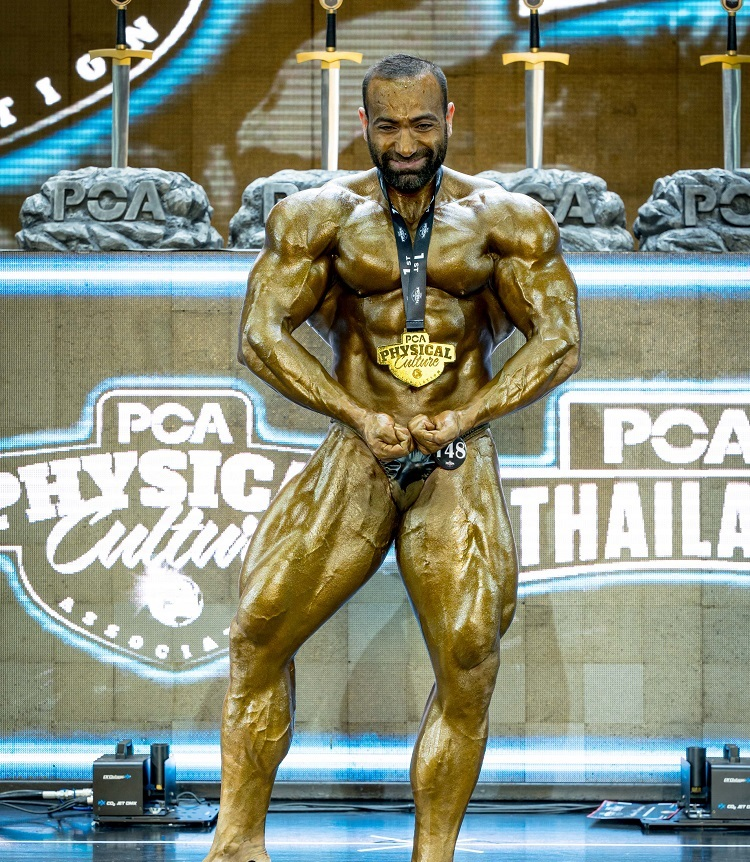
- Ali Ejlali in PCA Tiland 2022

Personal info
- Born: April 17, 1988 (age 37); Amol, Mazandaran, I.R.

Best statistics
- Contest weight: 260 pounds (118 kg)
- Height: 5 ft 11 in (180 cm)
- Off-season weight: 340 pounds (154 kg)

Ali Ejlali, (Persian: علی اجلالی; born April 17, 1988) is an Iranian professional bodybuilder. He is the UK Physical Culture Association (PCA) pro champion. Ejlali has participated in professional competitions in Italy and Thailand from 2014 to 2023, winning first place times.

Ejlali has competed in the Asian Games, winning the gold medal and finishing as the runner-up on another occasion. He has participated in the Franco Columbu Championships in Italy three times, earning gold medals. He has won ten gold medals in the Asian Games held in Thailand.

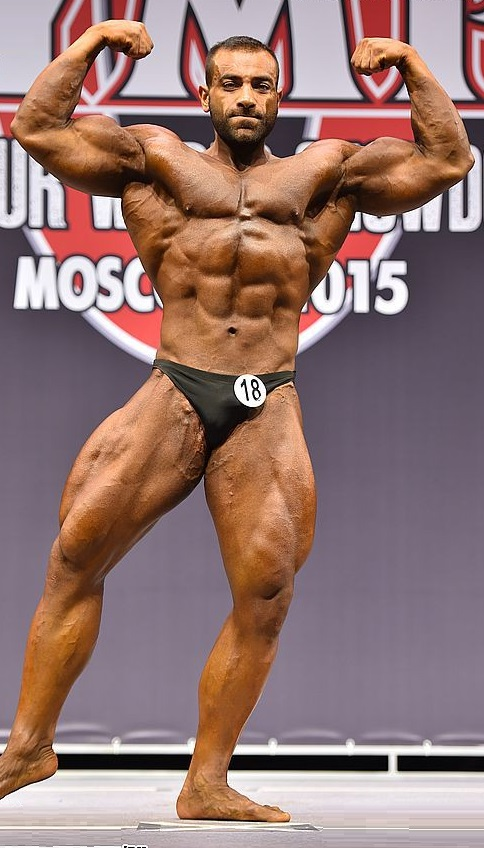
Ali Ejlali in Mr.Olympia 2015

Throughout these years, this bodybuilder has been awarded the individual overall winner five times in the Championships. Ali Ejlali was also among the medal winners in the Russian Amateur Mr. Olympia and Arnold Classic Africa tournaments.

== Early life ==
Ali Ejlali was born in the Iranian city of Amol, Mazandaran province, on April 17, 1988. He and his family moved from Amol to Tehran when he was a child, and he grew up in the Iranian capital.

== Career ==
Ali Ejlali’s first international and professional competition was the 2014 Macao Asian Games, where he achieved a runner-up position. In the same year, he took part in the World Championships held in India and finished in fourth place.

In 2015, he participated in the Amateur Mr. Olympia in Moscow, Russia, and notched a fifth-place finish. Inspired by Lee Andrew McCutcheon (Lee Priest), who served as his first professional trainer in 2015, Ali Ejlali began his pro bodybuilding career.

Ali Ejlali’s coach in 2017 was the Lebanese bodybuilder George Farah, and later, in 2018, he selected Jay Cutler as his trainer. In 2017, Ejlali competed in the Arnold Classic Africa in South Africa and earned a bronze medal. In the same year, he participated in three Franco Columbu competitions in Italy, winning gold medals. In 2018, he prepared for the World Championships besides Andy Cunningham, an Italian bodybuilding champion.

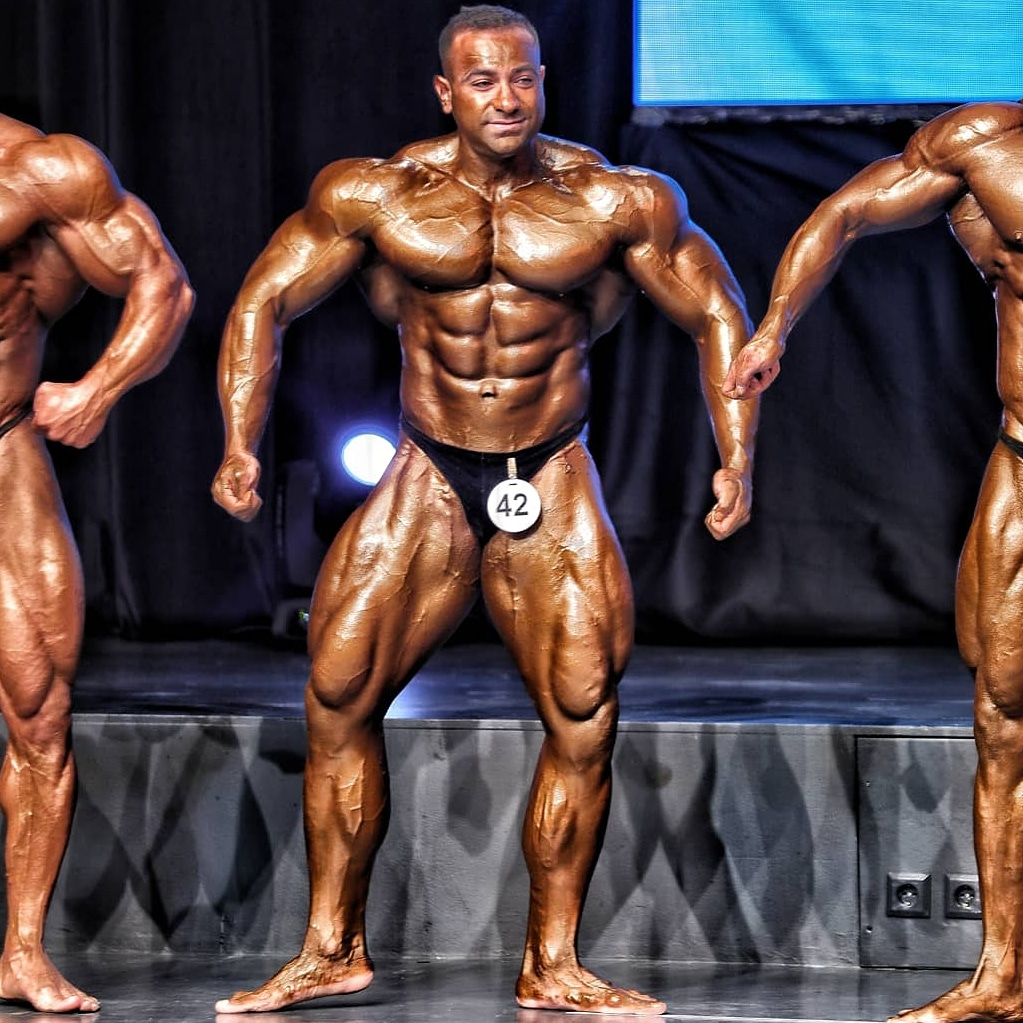
Ali Ejlali in Diamond Cup

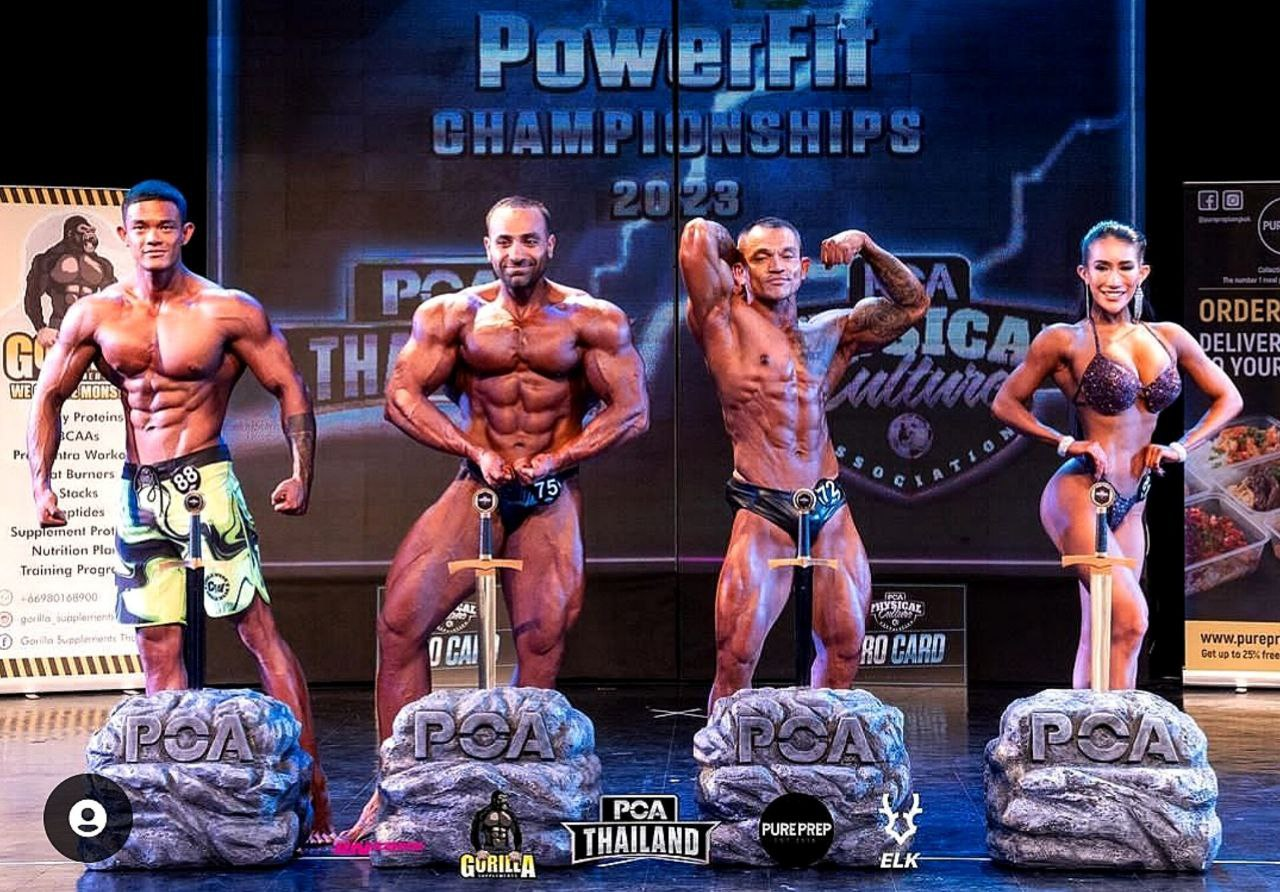
Ali Ejlali in PCA Thailand 2023

=== Stats ===
Ali Ejlali bodybuilder:

- Height: 5 ft 11 in (180 cm)
- Off-season weight: 250–340 pounds (113–154 kg)
- Competition weight: 242–259 pounds (110–117 kg)
- Upper arms: 22 in (56 cm)
- Chest: 58 in (150 cm)
- Thighs: 36 in (91 cm)
- Waist: 33 in (84 cm)
- Calves: 22 in (56 cm)

=== Individual Overall Winner ===
The individual overall winner refers to winning a medal among the first-place champions of all weight classes competing in the tournament. Between 2022 and 2023, this bodybuilder participated in 10 consecutive World and Asian Championships held in Thailand, gold medals and two fifth-place finishes. Ali Ejlali also competed in four international individual overall winner contests and to win the prize sword four times.

=== Retirement & Global Competitions ===
he announced his retirement in 2023, but in 2024, he decided to return to competing in global bodybuilding events. He is participating in the 2024 Olympia Amateur Eastern Europe, CA Pro Thailand, and Arnold Classic USA.

== Honors and awards ==
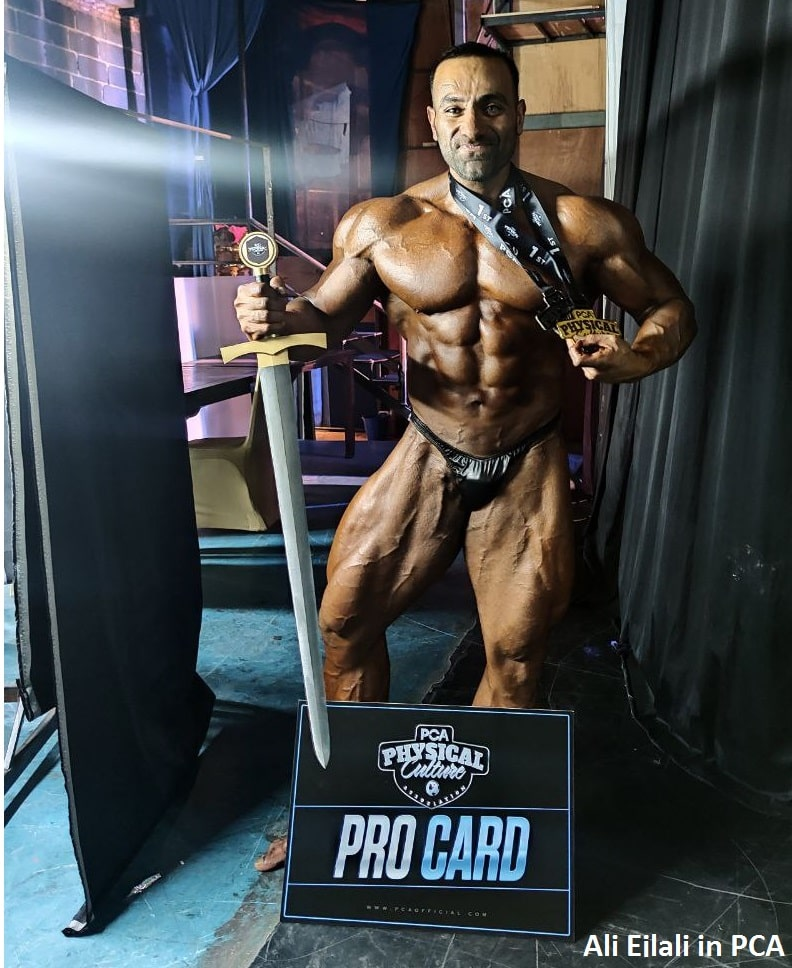
Ali Ejlali PCA 2023 & Pro Card

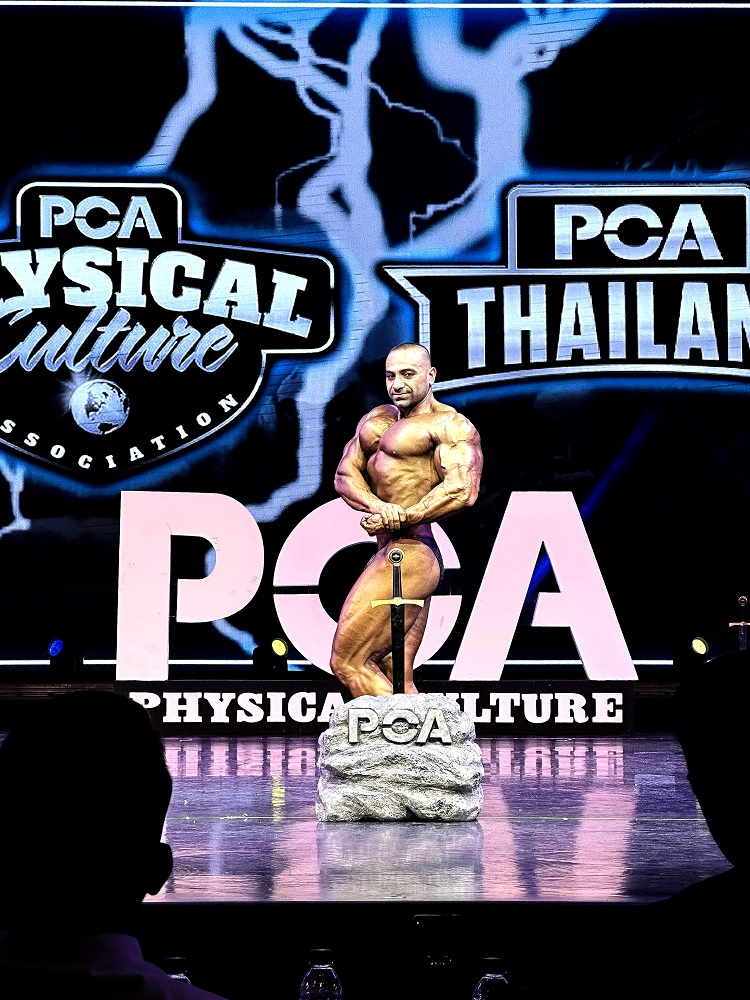
Ali Ejlali in PCA Thailand

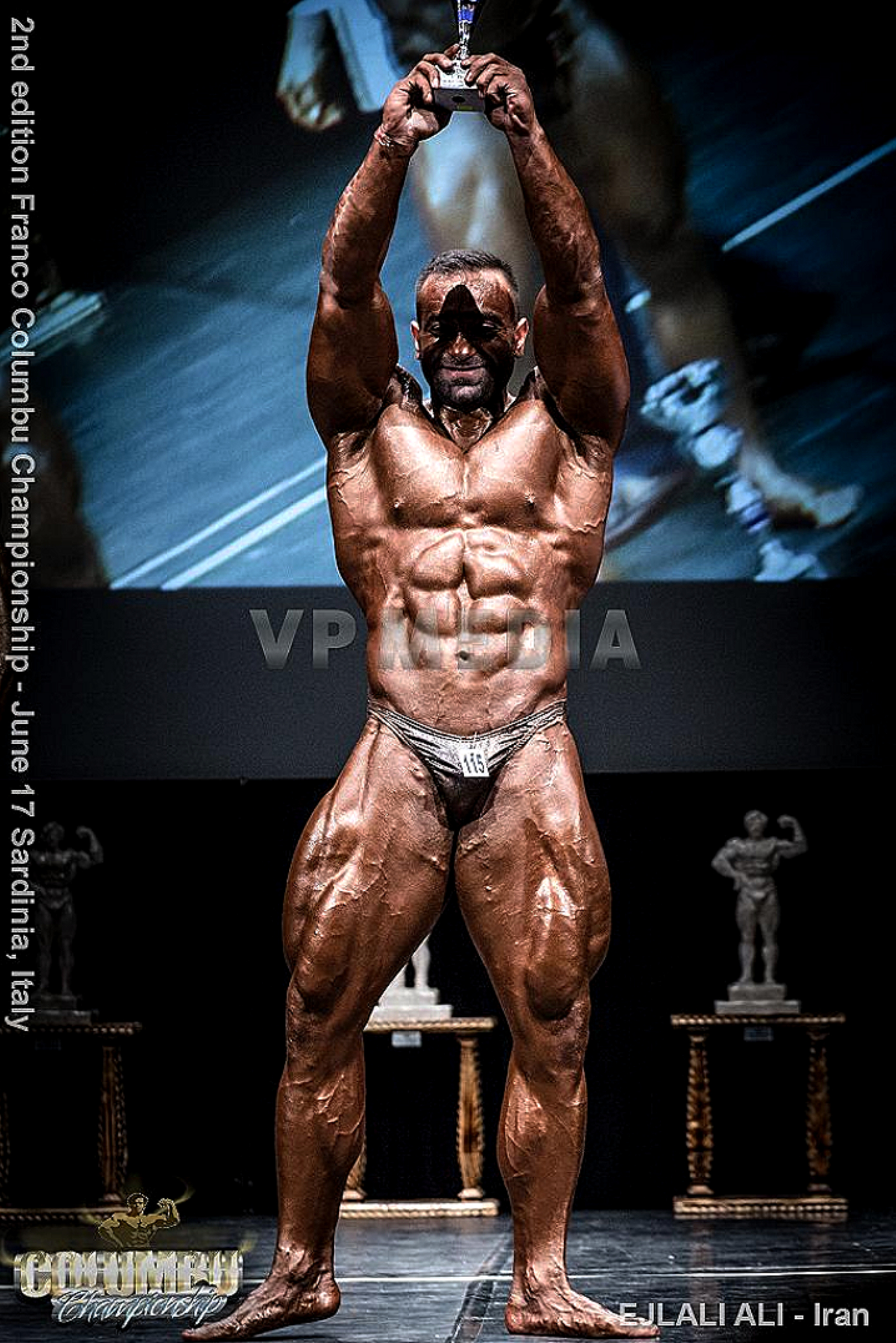
Ali ejlali in franco columbu italy

- World Physique and Bodybuilding Federation (WBPF) Coaching Certificate
- Academic Sports Degree from the United States Sports Academy
- Third-grade WNBF USA referee and coaching cards
- Pro Card PCA

== Competitive placings ==
Competition	Championships	Competitive placings
2014	WBPF World Championship Award 48th ASIAN Ch. Macau	2nd
2014	WBPF World Championship india	4th
2015	Mr.Olympia A Amateor Russia	5th
2017	Arnold Classic Africa	3rd
2017	Edition FRANCO COLUMBU International Championships, Cagliari, Sardinia Italy +198 pound	1st
2017	FRANCO COLUMBU Italy Height: 5 ft 8 in (178 cm)	1st
2017	individual overall winner	3rd
2017	Edition Franco Columbu Ch	1st
2017	Bodybuilding Overall Edition Franco Columbu Ch	1st
2017	Edition Franco Columbu ChCh/+ 95 kg	1st
2017	Bodybuilding Overall Edition Franco Columbu Ch/+ 95 kg	1st
2019	Asian Thailand	1st
2022	Asian Thailand	1st
2022	Asian PCA Thailand	1st
2022	individual overall winner/ Asian PCA Thailand	1st
2022	Classic Phuket, Thailand	1st
2022	individual overall winner /Classic Phuket, Thailand	1st
2022	WBPF World ChampionshipThailand	5th
2023	Classic Phuket, Thailand	1st
2023	individual overall winner / Classic Phuket, Thailand	1st
2023	Bangkok Show Thailand	1st
2023	individual overall winner / Bangkok Show Thailand	1st
2023	Men of steel Malaysia	5th

== See also ==
- List of male professional bodybuilders
