= Shweta Rathore =

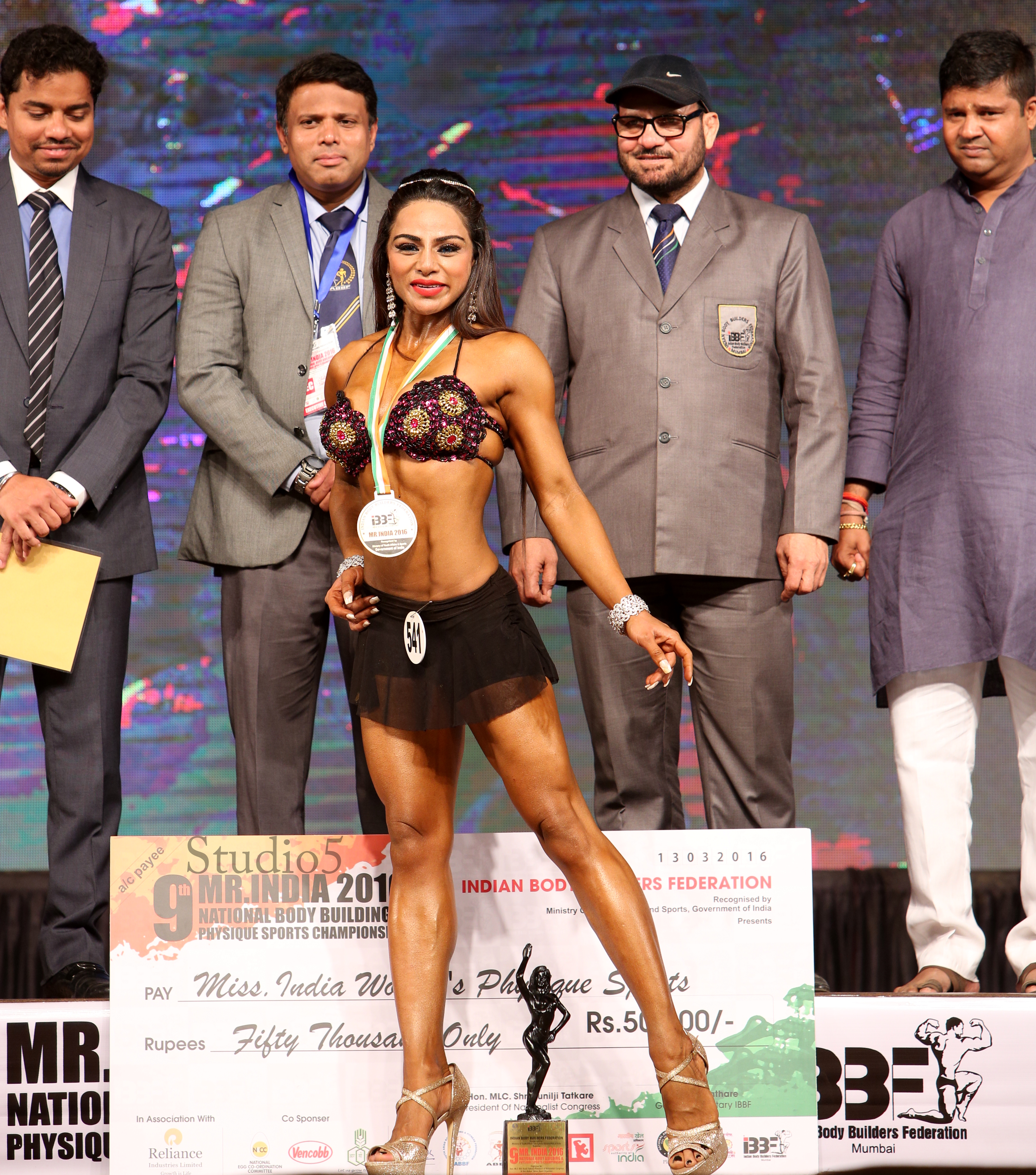
- Born: 13 June; Jaipur, Rajasthan, India
- Citizenship: Indian
- Occupation: International Physique Athlete
- Height: 5"5"

Shweta Rathore is an international physique Athlete . She is the first female from India who won the medal in world championship (she won bronze medal in 2014 at 6th WBPF World Championship).She won the 49th Asian championship. She is Miss World 2014 Fitness Physique, Miss Asia 2015 Fitness Physique, Miss India Sports Physique Champion 2015, Miss India 2016, Miss India 2017 she made history by winning Hattrick title. She is the Founder of Fitness Forever (p) Ltd .

== Early life and education ==
Shweta Rathore studied bio-chemical engineering at Manipur University. Shweta is an engineer by qualification and was working in a corporate scenario for many years in marketing. Since her school days, she was very much driven by fitness because she had a slightly broad frame. In India, not many people understand the difference between being large frame and being fat, and that’s why people started calling her fat. This thing hit her because she was a very active child and use to take part in cultural activities and sports at her school. Shweta started proper gyming when she was in 8th standard and from there onwards, it continues, and fitness became her lifestyle. She was very much driven into fitness so one day, her brother suggested Shweta to try it professionally, and that's how she came into fitness.

== Career ==
Rathore is an engineer.

She is the first Indian brand ambassador for Muscletech, and she is the brand ambassador for Avvatar.

Rathore is the founder and president of the NGO God's Beautiful Child.

== Awards and honors ==
- Miss world 2014 fitness physique
- Miss Asia 2015 Fitness physique
- Hattrick Miss India sports physique champion 2015, 2016,2017
- Awarded by Dubai Government as International Fitness Diva title 2018
- Miss Maharashtra sports physique champion
- First Indian Woman to bag a medal at the Fitness Physique World Championship
