= Mousa Esmaeilpour =

Iranian bodybuilder (born 1981)

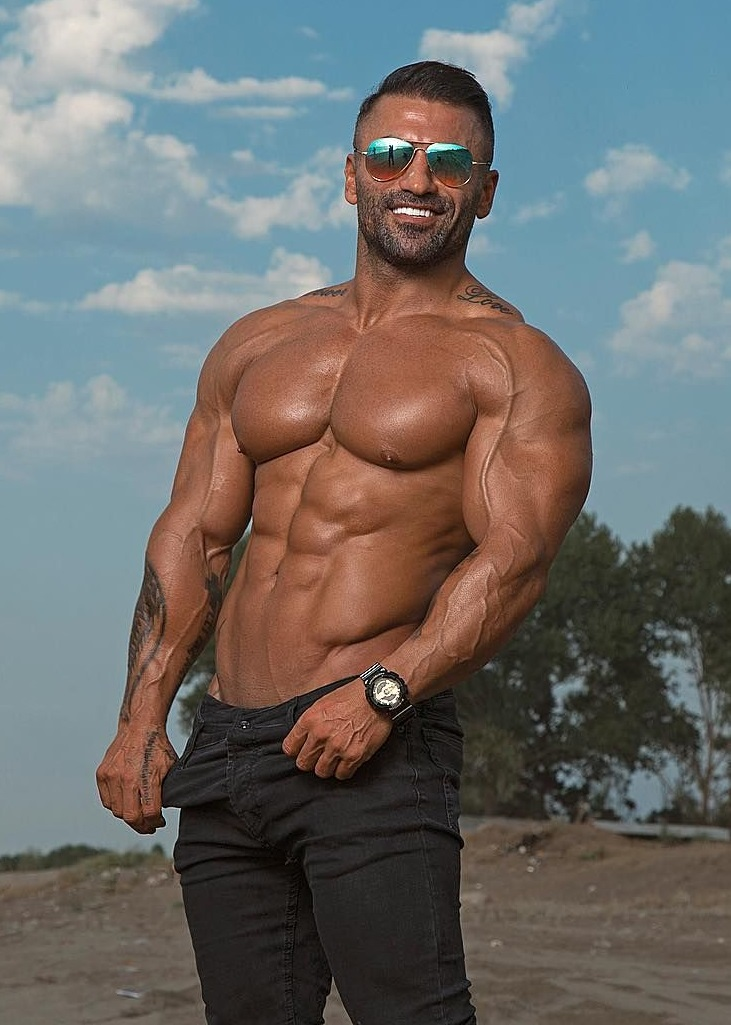
- Esmaeilpour in 2020

Personal information
- Full name: Mousa Esmaeilpour Karimi
- Nationality: Iranian
- Born: September 21, 1981; Babol, Mazandaran, Iran
- Occupation(s): Champion, bodybuilder
- Height: 1.68 m (5 ft 6 in)
- Weight: 90 kg (200 lb)
- Website: Official Telegram Account

Sport
- Country: Iran, Dubai
- Sport: Bodybuilding
- Now coaching: Iran national bodybuilding team

Mousa Esmaeilpour Karimi (Persian: موسی اسماعیل پور کریمی) is an Iranian professional bodybuilder and coach. He participated in different IFBB Competitions and he won different medals. He is currently the coach of Iran's national bodybuilding team and has won many honors.

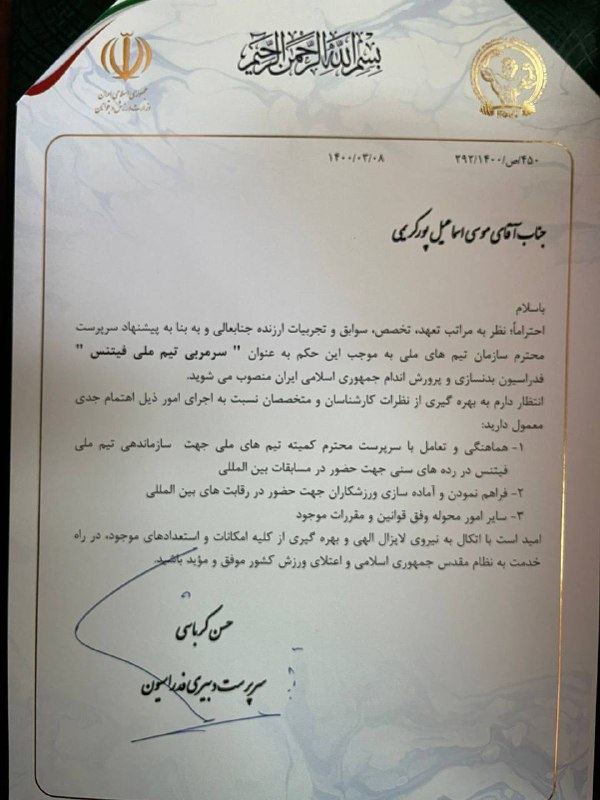
Fitness Coaching Assignment in 2021

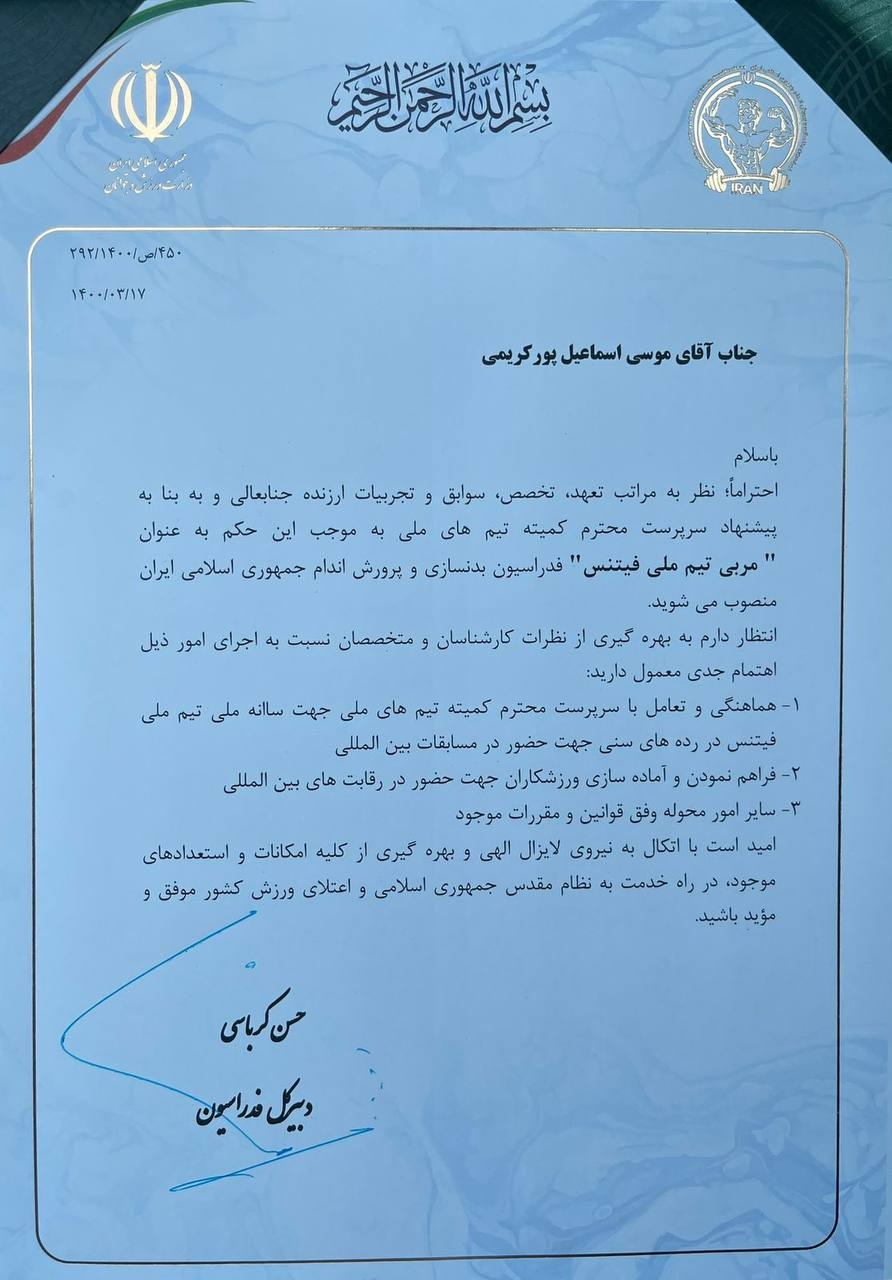
Iran National Fitness Team Coach's verdict

== Life and career ==
Mousa Esmaeilpour was born on September 21, 1981, in Babol, Iran. Mousa turned to a wrestling sport due to personal and family interests in 1996 he also participated in national competitions and he has won numerous awards. But he left the wrestling sport due to injuries after four years.

He started bodybuilding as a professional athlete after one year of his injuries in 2001 when there was no longer able to continue wrestling. Mousa began his exercises and work hard at the gym. After a while, he won the first place at the national bodybuilding competition in 2003. Then he moved to Dubai in 2004 where he continued his fitness training.

Mousa didn't participate in any competitions for a few years, but he participated in the Asian competitions in 2010 and then he won the Asian championship and he got the most beautifully good shaped body certificate, IFBB certificate, and also an honorary Jay Cutler's certificate. After that, he came back to Iran and started again his activities.

Mousa Esmaeilpour went away from his fitness exercises again, but he prepared himself for the International Indian Bodybuilding competition in 2014. But this time he prepared himself for the Physique fitness competition with hard work and heavy exercises. Mousa has won 2nd place in an Indian competition for the first time as an Iranian athlete. He got a WBPF coach certificate. He worked out with heavy exercises again and he participated in IFBB Dubai Muscle Show 2016 he was awarded Gold Medal and took first place in the Physique sports championship.

== Titles and honors ==
Year	Competition	Place
2003	IFBB National Competition	1st Place
2010	Asian ABBF Bodybuilding Competition	2nd Place
2014	6th WBPF World Bodybuilding & Physique Championship (Fitness Physique - up to 170cm)	2nd Place
2015	World Europe Arnold Classic Bodybuilding Competition	2nd Place
2016	IFBB Dubai Muscle Show	1st Place
