= Yatinder Singh =

Indian bodybuilder

- ♂ Professional bodybuilder

Personal info
- Born: Saharanpur, Uttar Pradesh, India

Best statistics
- Height: 5 ft 5 in (165 cm)
- Weight: 90–120 kg (198–265 lb)

Professional (Pro) career
- Pro-debut: Jr. Mr India; 2005
- Best win: WBPF Championship Bangkok; 2015

Yatinder Singh is an Indian bodybuilder, entrepreneur and fitness icon. His most recent accomplishments include the silver medal in 7th World Body Building and Physique Championship 2015 and Mr. India 2016.

== Early life ==
Yatinder was born and raised in Saharanpur town of Uttar Pradesh.

== Career ==
=== Bodybuilding career ===
The year 2001 marked the beginning of Singh's bodybuilding career. After winning his first championship in 2002, he took part in several bodybuilding and fitness competitions in India and later internationally.

=== Major injury ===
Singh had started preparing for Mr. Asia 2005. One evening while working out, he was seriously injured due to the negligence of a helping boy. Singh's lower back vertebrae had ruptured causing nerve injuries. His right hand and leg about 30 percent paralyzed. As a result, he was bedridden for months.

Singh had to stay away from bodybuilding for the next three years. To become financially independent, he soon started working as a personal trainer in a gym in Meerut, Uttar Pradesh. In 2008, he moved to Gurgaon to pursue his career as a businessman.

=== Second chance in bodybuilding ===
By 2008, Singh's back had recovered substantially and he returned to bodybuilding. He started researching and studying techniques that would help him work out without straining himself. He completed ACE and ACSM training courses. In 2010, Singh won several championships such as Mr. UP Overall title, Mr. North India, Senior Mr. India title in 75 kg category. He was also the first runner-up in the overall Sr. Mr. India and won the title of the Best Improved Bodybuilder.

He went on to win many more national and international titles.

== Contest history ==
Year	Competition	Location	Title/Medal
2022	54th Asian Bodybuilding And Physique Sports Championship 2022	Mafushi, Republic of Maldives	Gold
2016	Mr. International Championship	Dubai	Bronze
2016	Senior Mr.India Body Building Championship	Maharashtra	Gold
2016.	Svayambhu Shree Classic All India Invitational Championship	Maharashtra	Bronze
2016	Federation Cup	Ludhiana	Overall Title
2015	World Body Building & Physique Sports Championship	Bangkok	Silver
2015	Mr. India Satish Sugar Classic Championship	Karnataka	Overall Title
2015	Mr. India Talwalkar's Classic Bodybuilding Championship	Mumbai	Silver
2015	Mr. U.P.	Uttar Pradesh	Overall Title
2015	Mr. North India Championship	New Delhi	Overall Title
2014	WBPF World Championship	Mumbai	4th Place
2014	Mr. U.P.	Uttar Pradesh	Overall Title
2010	Best-Improved Bodybuilder of the Year	-	Title
2010	50th National Bodybuilding Championship	Assam	Gold
2009	North India Bodybuilding Championship	Chandigarh	Overall Title
2009	North India Classic Championship	Faridabad	Silver
2004	5th Federation Cup Championship	Chhattisgarh	Gold
2004	Best-Improved Bodybuilder of the Year	-	Title
2004	Jr. Mr. India	India	Silver
2004	Mr. North India	New Delhi	Gold, Overall Title
2002	Mr. Saharanpur	Uttar Pradesh	Overall Title
2002	Western Uttar Pradesh Championship	Uttar Pradesh	Gold
