= Peter Joseph Gnalian =

Indian bodybuilder

- ♂ professional bodybuilder
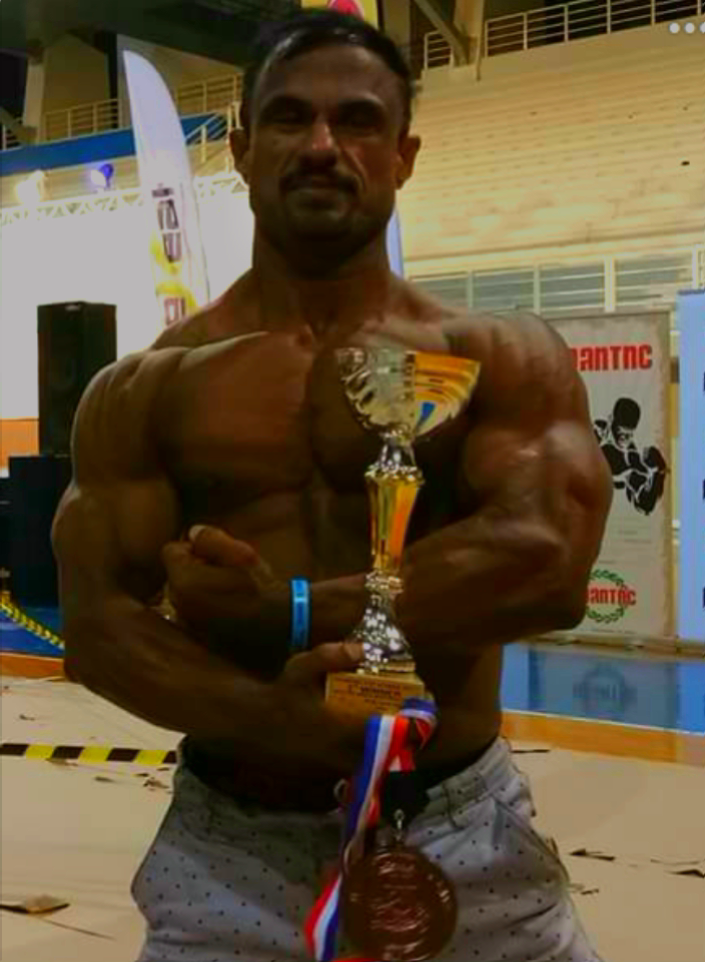
- Peter Joseph in Athens, Greece at the Olympic stadium 2017

Personal info
- Born: 16 December 1960 (age 64); Angamaly, Kerala, India

Best statistics

Peter Joseph Gnalian (born 16 December 1960) is an Indian professional bodybuilder from Kochi Angamaly.

He won a bronze medal from the International Federation of Bodybuilding and Fitness (IFBB) in the over 50s category.

Gnalian worked for Indian Railways and as an accountant until he sought voluntary retirement from service in March, 2017. He returned to body building at the age of 42. Prior to that, in 2009, he competed in the world championship, obtaining fifth place in Poland. He won a silver medal at the Asian Masters in 2012, and a bronze at the 2012 World Masters in Bangkok, silver in Asian Masters’ in China, 2013, as well as fourth place in the World Masters’ 2014 and 2016 held in Mumbai and Pattaya respectively.
