= Guljahon Turdikulova =

Uzbekistani bodybuilder and fitness model

Guljahon Turdikulova Guljakhon Turdikulova
- ♀ Professional bodybuilder
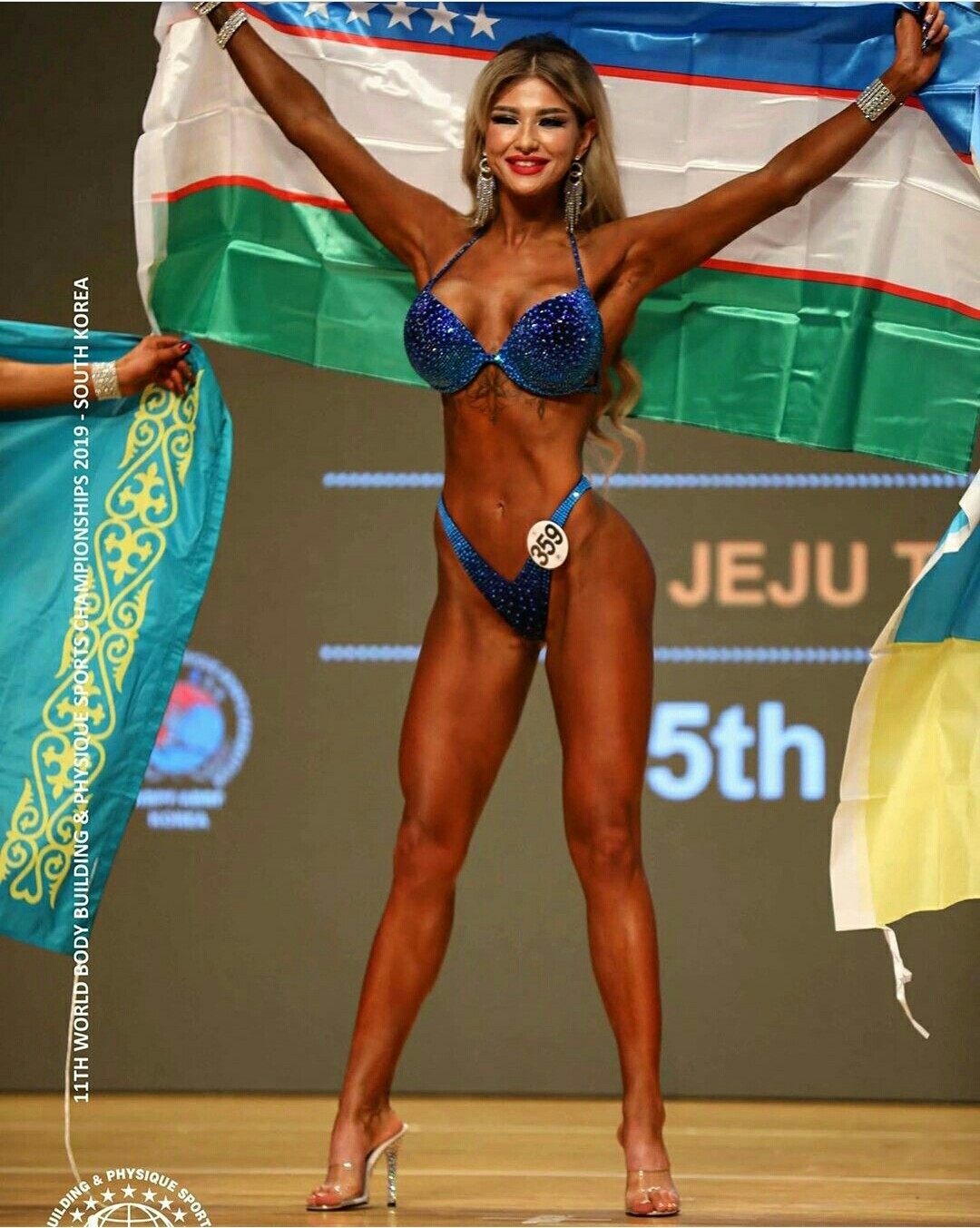

Personal info
- Born: November 11, 1993 (age 31)

Best statistics
- Height: 177 cm (5 ft 10 in)
- Weight: 65 kg (143 lb)

Professional (Pro) career
- Pro-debut: 2017
- Best win: Arnold Classic (NPC-IFBB); 2022
- Active: Yes

Guljahon Turdikulova (uzb: Guljahon Turdiqulova, ru: Турдикулова, Гульжахон Махаматжоновна; born 11 November 1993, Jizzakh) is an Uzbekistani bodybuilder and fitness model. She was the winner of the Asian Bodybuilding and Physique Championship in 2017 and 2018, 5x champion of Uzbekistan, and final medalist of the Arnold Classic in NPC-IFBB 2022.

== Biography ==
Turdikulova started her bodybuilding career in 2016 by participiating in national championships. She won her first international competition in 2015 at 49th ABBF-WBPF Asian Championship obtaining gold medal. In 2016 she won silver medal of the next Asian Bodybuilding Championship in Bhutan. She became silver medalist of 2019 WBPF World Championships in Jeju, Korea in category Model-physique +170 cm.

== Anthropometry ==
- Height: 177 cm
- Off Season Weight: 68 kg
- Competition Weight: 65 kg

== Competitions ==
Year	Competition	Place	Category	Result
2022	Arnold Classic (NPC-IFBB)	Columbus, USA	Bikini Model	2nd
2021	Beach fitness (final)	Tashkent, Uzbekistan	Model-Physicist	1st
2020	Uzbekistan Bodybuilding and Fitness PROFORM Classic Cup 2020	Tashkent, Uzbekistan	Model-Physicist (women) / over 170 cm	1st
2019	PROFORM Classic Sports Festival 2019 – Championship of Uzbekistan in Bodybuilding and Fitness	Uzbekistan	Model-Physicist (women) / over 170 cm	1st
2019	2019 WBPF World Championships	Jeju, South Korea	Women's Model Physique	2nd
2018	2019 WBPF World Championships,	Chiang Mai, Thailand	Women's Model Physique	Final
2018	49th ABBF-WBPF Asian Championship	Chiang Mai, Thailand	Model Physique	2nd
2018	Open Championship of Uzbekistan in Bodybuilding and Fitness 2018	Tashkent, Uzbekistan	Model Physique	2 nd
2018	52nd Asian Bodybuilding and Fitness Championship 2018 (ABBF-WBPF)	Puna, India	Model Physique +165 cm	1st
2018	Central Asian Bodybuilding and Fitness Championship	Tashkent, Uzbekistan	Model Physique	1st
2017	Asian Bodybuilding and Fitness Championships (ABBF-WBPF)	Seul, South Korea	\Model Physicist (women) over 165 cm	1st
2017	Cup of Uzbekistan in Bodybuilding and Fitness 2017	Tashkent, Uzbekistan	Model-Physicist (women) / over 165 cm	3rd
2016	Cup of Uzbekistan in Bodybuilding and Fitness 2017	Tashkent, Uzbekistan	Model-Physicist (women) / over 165 cm	1st
