= Pavel Umurzakov =

Professional Bodybuilder

- ♂ professional bodybuilder
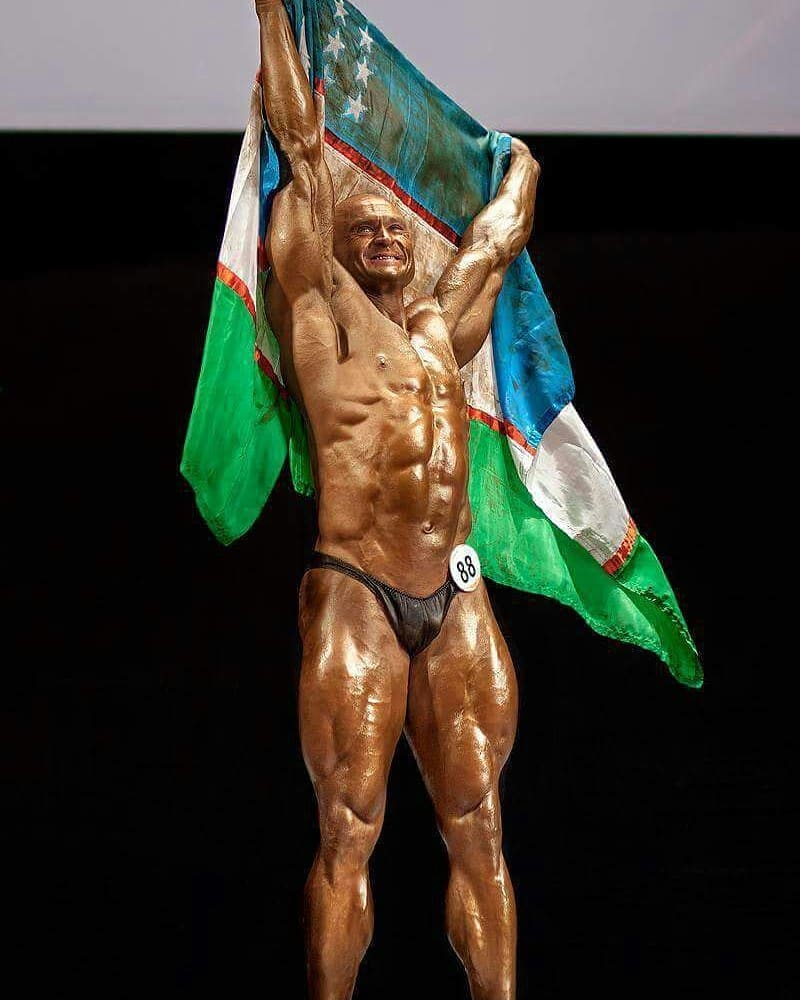

Personal info
- Born: 8 November 1976 (age 48); Kyrgyzstan, USSR

Best statistics
- Height: 172 cm (5 ft 8 in)
- Weight: Contest: 90 kg Off season: 105-107 kg

Professional (Pro) career
- Pro-debut: IFBB MEN'S WORLD CHAMPIONSHIPS (gold); 2016
- Best win: Arnold Classic (NPC-IFBB) (gold); 2022
- Active: yes

Pavel Umurzakov (uzb. Pavel Petrovich Umurzakov born 8 November 1976 in Kyrgyzstan) is a professional bodybuilder, absolute champion of Uzbekistan in 2014, 2016 and absolute champion of Central Asia in 2017, two-time Champion of Asia (ABBF-WBPF) in 2015, 2018 and four-time World Bodybuilding and Fitness Champion (WBPF) in 2016, 2018, 2019, and 2021.

== Biography ==
Pavel Umurzakov was born in Jalalabad, Kyrgyzstan. In 1989, he moved with his family to Tashkent. His sports career began when he was 30 years old, before his bodybuilding career he got into hand-to-hand combat fight and oriental martial arts Jeet Kune Do that was conceived by Bruce Lee. Umurzakov won 1st place in his first national tournament when he was 35 years old. In 2014, he participated at international tournament and won gold medal of tournier that held in Kazakhstan. Umurzakovs is the first World Champion in bodybuilding in the history of Uzbekistan. He won the "gold" of the World Championship in Thailand in 2016. In 2022, he obtained his the best medal of Bodybuilding career at Arnold Classic (NPC-IFBB) by winning category over 35 in light heavyweight division that held in Columbus, Ohio.

== Family ==
He is married and his wife Olesya Gureeva is also a professional bodybuilder and mas-wrestler, winner of Arnold Classic 2022.

== Anthropometry ==
- Height: 5 ft 62 in (172 cm)
- Off Season Weight: 105–107 kg
- Competition Weight: 90 kg
- Upper Arm Size: 47–50 cm
- Chest: 52in 30 cm
- Thigh Size: 75 cm
- Waist Size: 85 cm
- Calf Size: 47 cm

== Competitions ==
Pavel Umurzakov in Bodybuilding Competitions and results
Year	Competition	Place	Result
2011	Bodybuilding and Fitness - "Night of Champions 2011"	Uzbekistan	2nd
2012	Championship of Uzbekistan IFB	Uzbekistan	1st
2013	Bodybuilding Championship - PROFORM Classic	Uzbekistan	1st
2014	Bodybuilding Championship - PROFORM Classic	Uzbekistan	1st
2014	Central Asia and Kazakhstan Championship	Kazakhstan	1st
2014	Championship of Uzbekistan IFB	Uzbekistan	1st
2015	Tashkent Cup	Uzbekistan	1st
2015	49th ABBF-WBPF Asian Championship	Uzbekistan	1st
2016	Championship of Uzbekistan IFB	Uzbekistan	1st
2016	Tashkent Cup	Uzbekistan	3rd
2016	50th Asian Bodybuilding and Fitness Championship	Bhutan	2nd
2016	Cup of Uzbekistan in Bodybuilding and Fitness	Uzbekistan	1st
2016	World Championship (WBPF)	Thailand	1st
2016	Cup of Uzbekistan	Uzbekistan	1st
2017	Cup of Uzbekistan in Bodybuilding, Fitness and Mas-Wrestling	Uzbekistan	1st
2017	Central Asia and Kazakhstan Championship (WBPF)	Kazakhstan	1st
2017	Tashkent Open Cup	Uzbekistan	2nd
2017	51st Asian Bodybuilding and Fitness Championship	South Korea	Final
2017	IX World Championship in Bodybuilding and Fitness (WBPF)	Mongolia	2nd
2018	52nd Asian Bodybuilding and Fitness Championship	India	2nd
2018	World Bodybuilding and Fitness Championship (WBPF)	Thailand	1st
2019	53rd Asian Bodybuilding and Fitness Championship	Indonesia	2nd
2019	World Bodybuilding and Fitness Championship 2019 (WBPF)	South Korea	1st
2019	PROFORM Classic Sports Festival	Uzbekistan	1st
2021	Championship of Uzbekistan IFB	Uzbekistan	1st
2021	World Championship of Bodybuilding and Fitness (WBPF)	Uzbekistan	2nd
2022	Arnold Classic (NPC-IFBB)	USA	1st
2022	54th Asian Bodybuilding and Fitness Championship (ABBF-WBPF)	Maldives	2nd
