= 2015 WBPF World Championship =

International competition in bodybuilding and fitness (2015)

7th WBPF World Championship in Bodybuilding and Fitness
- 2015

Tournament information
- Sport: Bodybuilding / Fitness
- Location: Bangkok, Thailand
- Dates: November 24–30th, 2014
- Venue: The Mall Bangkapi Convention Center

The 7th WBPF World Championship was a major international competition in bodybuilding and fitness, as governed by the World Bodybuilding and Physique Federation (WBPF). It took place in The Mall Bangkapi Convention Center venue, Bangkok, Thailand from November 24 to November 30, 2015.

This championship was preceded by 2014 WBPF World Championship held in Mumbai, India and succeeded by 2016 WBPF World Championship held in Pattaya, Thailand.
