= List of flag bearers for Uzbekistan at the Olympics =

Uzbekistan at the Olympics
- IOC code: UZB
- NOC: National Olympic Committee of the Republic of Uzbekistan
- Website: www.olympic.uz (in Uzbek and English)
- Medals: Gold 19 Silver 8 Bronze 23 Total 50

Summer appearances
- 1996; 2000; 2004; 2008; 2012; 2016; 2020; 2024

Winter appearances
- 1994; 1998; 2002; 2006; 2010; 2014; 2018; 2022; 2026

Other related appearances
- Russian Empire (1900–1912); Soviet Union (1952–1988); Unified Team (1992)

This is a list of flag bearers who have represented Uzbekistan at the Olympics.

Flag bearers carry the national flag of their country at the opening ceremony of the Olympic Games.

#	Event year	Season	Flag bearer	Sport
1	1994	Winter	Sergey Brener	Freestyle skiing
2	1996	Summer	Timur Ibragimov	Boxing
3	1998	Winter	Komil Urunbayev	Alpine skiing
4	2000	Summer	Mahammatkodir Abdullaev	Boxing
5	2002	Winter	Komil Urunbayev	Alpine skiing
6	2004	Summer	Abdullo Tangriev	Judo
7	2006	Winter	Kayrat Ermetov	Alpine skiing
8	2008	Summer	Dilshod Mahmudov	Boxing
9	2010	Winter	Oleg Shamaev	Alpine skiing
10	2012	Summer	Elshod Rasulov	Boxing
11	2014	Winter	Kseniya Grigoreva	Alpine skiing
12	2016	Summer	Bakhodir Jalolov	Boxing
13	2018	Winter	Komiljon Tukhtaev	Alpine skiing
14	2020	Summer	Bakhodir Jalolov	Boxing
14	2020	Summer	Nigora Tursunkulova	Taekwondo
15	2022	Winter	Komiljon Tukhtaev	Alpine skiing
16	2024	Summer	Zaynab Dayibekova	Fencing
16	2024	Summer	Abdumalik Khalokov	Boxing

== See also ==
- Uzbekistan at the Olympics
