= Uzbekistan at the 2014 Winter Olympics =

- IOC code: UZB
- NOC: National Olympic Committee of the Republic of Uzbekistan
- Website: www.olympic.uz (in Uzbek and English)

in Sochi
- Competitors: 3 in 2 sports
- Flag bearers: Kseniya Grigoreva (opening and closing)
- Medals: Gold 0 Silver 0 Bronze 0 Total 0

Winter Olympics appearances (overview)
- 1994; 1998; 2002; 2006; 2010; 2014; 2018; 2022; 2026; 2030

Other related appearances
- Soviet Union (1956–1988)

Uzbekistan competed at the 2014 Winter Olympics in Sochi, Russia from 7 to 23 February 2014. A team of three athletes in two sports competed for Uzbekistan.

== Alpine skiing ==
Uzbekistan qualified two athletes to compete.

Athlete	Event	Run 1		Run 2		Total	
Athlete	Event	Time	Rank	Time	Rank	Time	Rank
Artem Voronov	Men's slalom	1:00.42	70	1:10.54	40	2:10.96	39
Artem Voronov	Men's giant slalom	1:37.09	72	1:38.36	68	3:15.45	67
Kseniya Grigoreva	Women's slalom	1:07.77	54	DNF			
Kseniya Grigoreva	Women's giant slalom	1:34.56	67	1:36.98	65	3:11.54	64

== Figure skating ==
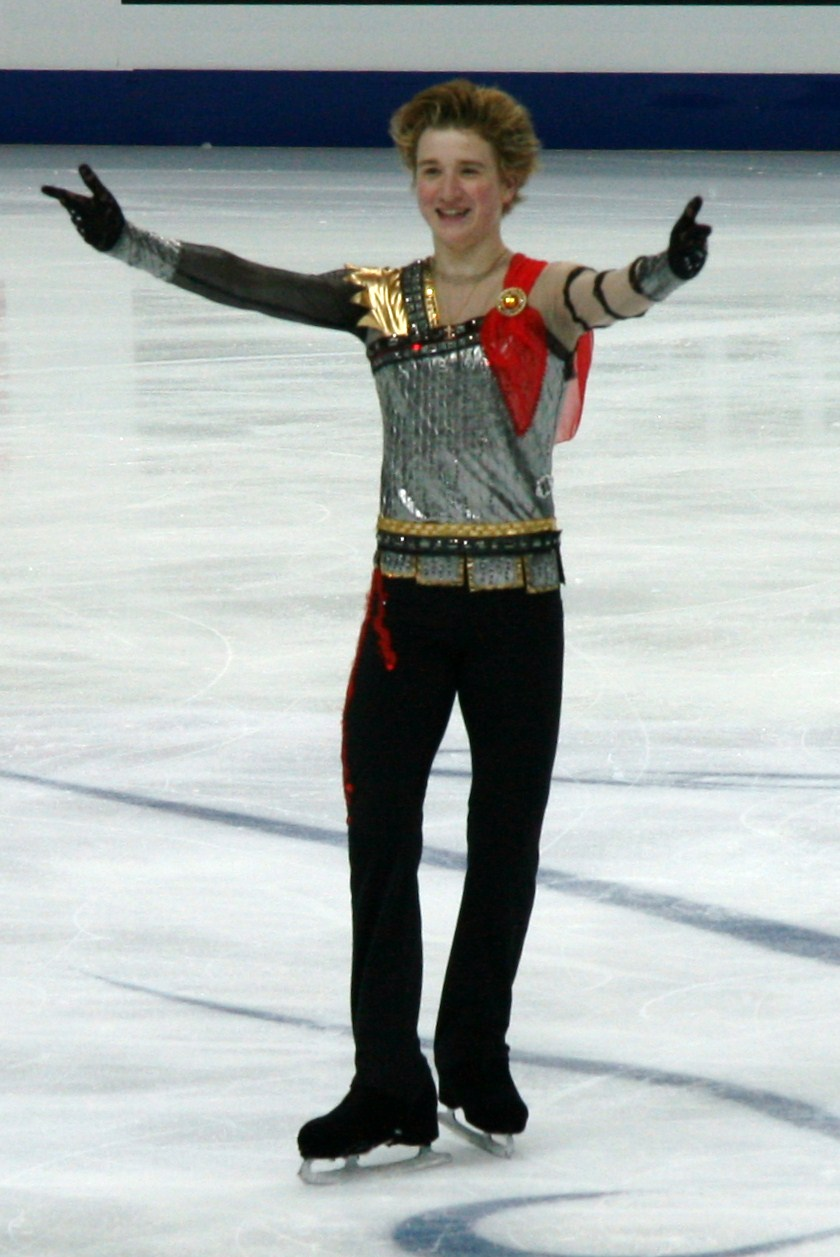
Misha Ge (seen here in 2011) competed in figure skating.

Uzbekistan achieved the following quota places: Misha Ge finished in 17th position out of 30 competitors in the men's singles event.

Athlete	Event	SP		FS		Total	
Athlete	Event	Points	Rank	Points	Rank	Points	Rank
Misha Ge	Men's singles	68.07	18 Q	135.19	17	203.26	17

== See also ==
- Uzbekistan at the 2014 Summer Youth Olympics
- Uzbekistan at the 2014 Winter Paralympics
