= Uzbekistan at the 2002 Winter Olympics =

- IOC code: UZB
- NOC: National Olympic Committee of the Republic of Uzbekistan
- Website: www.olympic.uz (in Uzbek and English)

in Salt Lake City
- Competitors: 6 (3 men and 3 women) in 2 sports
- Flag bearer: Komil Urunbayev (alpine skiing)
- Medals: Gold 0 Silver 0 Bronze 0 Total 0

Winter Olympics appearances (overview)
- 1994; 1998; 2002; 2006; 2010; 2014; 2018; 2022; 2026; 2030

Other related appearances
- Soviet Union (1956–1988)

Uzbekistan competed at the 2002 Winter Olympics in Salt Lake City, United States.

== Alpine skiing ==
Men

Athlete	Event	Race 1	Race 2	Total	
Athlete	Event	Time	Time	Time	Rank
Komil Urunbayev	Slalom	1:04.09	DNF	DNF	–

Women

Athlete	Event	Race 1	Race 2	Total	
Athlete	Event	Time	Time	Time	Rank
Elmira Urumbayeva	Slalom	1:14.51	1:10.39	2:24.90	38

== Figure skating ==
Men

Athlete	Points	SP	FS	Rank
Roman Skorniakov	29.0	20	19	19

Women

Athlete	Points	SP	FS	Rank
Tatiana Malinina	DNF	13	DNF	–

Pairs

Athletes	Points	SP	FS	Rank
Natalia Ponomareva; Evgeni Sviridov	27.0	18	18	18
