= Tukhtaev =

Tukhtaev is a surname. Notable people with the surname include:

- Alisher Tukhtaev (born 1975), Tajikistani footballer
- Komiljon Tukhtaev (born 1997), Uzbekistani alpine ski racer
