= Alpine skiing at the 2019 Winter Universiade – Men's combined =

Men's combined at the XXIX Winter Universiade
- Venues: Bobrovy Log
- Dates: 5 March
- Competitors: 67 from 26 nations
- Winning time: 1:35.59

Medalists
1st place, gold medalist(s)		Yannick Chabloz	Switzerland
2nd place, silver medalist(s)		Anton Endzhievskiy	Russia
3rd place, bronze medalist(s)		Nikita Alekhin	Russia

The men's combined competition of the 2019 Winter Universiade was held at Bobrovy Log, Krasnoyarsk, Russia on 5 March 2019.

== Results ==
The race was started at 10:00 (super-G race) and 13:30 (slalom race).

Rank	Bib	Name	Nation	Super-G	Rank	Slalom	Rank	Total	Behind
1st place, gold medalist(s)	6	Yannick Chabloz	Switzerland	57.21	7	38.38	5	1:35.59	—
2nd place, silver medalist(s)	42	Anton Endzhievskiy	Russia	58.48	30	37.25	1	1:35.73	+0.14
3rd place, bronze medalist(s)	19	Nikita Alekhin	Russia	58.06	19	37.69	2	1:35.75	+0.16
4	4	Matevž Rupnik	Slovenia	57.50	10	38.44	6	1:35.94	+0.35
5	27	Arnaud Boisset	Switzerland	56.70	3	39.31	16	1:36.01	+0.42
6	2	Tomáš Klinský	Czech Republic	56.31	1	39.92	23	1:36.23	+0.64
7	14	Miks Zvejnieks	Latvia	58.20	23	38.27	4	1:36.47	+0.88
8	38	Denis Vorobev	Russia	58.33	27	38.16	3	1:36.49	+0.90
9	28	Martin Štěpán	Czech Republic	58.01	17	38.66	11	1:36.67	+1.08
10	50	Sebastiano Andreis	Italy	57.86	16	38.91	13	1:36.77	+1.18
11	47	Alexandre Coltier	France	58.62	32	38.46	7	1:37.08	+1.49
12	22	Martin Hyška	Slovakia	58.61	31	38.57	8	1:37.18	+1.59
13	23	Kim Dong-woo	South Korea	58.01	17	39.36	19	1:37.37	+1.78
14	8	Jan Skořepa	Czech Republic	58.31	26	39.35	18	1:37.66	+2.07
15	40	Yohei Koyama	Japan	59.10	37	38.64	10	1:37.74	+2.15
16	5	Michal Staszowski	Czech Republic	59.26	43	38.67	12	1:37.93	+2.34
17	24	Dominik Bialobrzycki	Poland	58.07	21	39.93	24	1:38.00	+2.41
18	34	Szymon Bębenek	Poland	58.26	25	39.79	22	1:38.05	+2.46
19	25	Henrich Katrenič	Slovakia	58.47	29	39.59	20	1:38.06	+2.47
20	26	Benjamin Szollos	Israel	59.17	41	39.02	14	1:38.19	+2.60
21	11	Paco Rassat	France	59.76	53	38.62	9	1:38.38	+2.79
22	27	Davide Baruffaldi	Italy	59.11	38	39.33	17	1:38.44	+2.85
23	17	Thomas Volgger	Austria	58.36	28	40.28	26	1:38.64	+3:05
24	55	Loïc Baudin	France	59.45	46	39.27	15	1:38.72	+3.13
25	58	Hayata Wakatsuki	Japan	59.62	49	39.63	21	1:39.25	+3.66
26	64	Jean-Christophe Allard	Canada	1:00.20	56	40.05	25	1:40.25	+4.66
27	37	Paweł Babicki	Poland	56.57	2	43.76	35	1:40.33	+4.74
28	61	Olaf Borsboom	Netherlands	59.62	49	40.78	28	1:40.40	+4.81
29	54	Manuel Hug	Liechtenstein	59.88	54	40.55	27	1:40.43	+4.84
30	36	Andrzej Dziedzic	Poland	57.39	9	43.35	34	1:40.74	+5.15
31	62	Leo Lamon	Belgium	59.96	55	40.96	29	1:40.92	+5.33
32	44	Zakhar Kuchin	Kazakhstan	59.57	48	42.04	32	1:41.61	+6.02
33	48	Dāvis Zvejnieks	Latvia	1:00.67	60	41.63	30	1:42.30	+6.71
34	67	Lovro Široki	Croatia	1:00.57	59	41.84	31	1:42.41	+6.82
35	52	Komiljon Tukhtaev	Uzbekistan	1:01.39	61	42.63	33	1:44.02	+8.43
36	20	Gian-Andrea Hehli	Switzerland	56.98	4	48.48	39	1:45.46	+9.87
37	46	Alexandre Fortin	Canada	59.33	45	47.34	37	1:46.67	+11.08
38	63	Sten-Mark Virro	Estonia	1:03.12	63	43.94	36	1:47.06	+11.47
39	39	Antoni Szczepanik	Poland	58.80	35	48.94	40	1:47.74	+12.15
40	56	Tomas Bacigalupo	Argentina	1:01.68	62	47.83	38	1:49.51	+13.92
41	66	Aldiyor Gaipov	Uzbekistan	1:10.33	65	49.63	41	1:59.96	+24.37
42	65	Damir Bukharbaev	Uzbekistan	1:07.59	64	52.61	42	2:00.20	+24.61
	3	Ivan Kuznetsov	Russia	57.00	5	DNF	—		
	7	Paul Perrier	France	58.06	19	DNF	—		
	9	Arne Ackermann	Switzerland	57.80	14	DNF	—		
	12	Ven Florjančič	Slovenia	57.38	8	DNF	—		
	13	Jan Zabystřan	Czech Republic	57.84	15	DNF	—		
	16	Tommaso Canclini	Italy	59.16	40	DNF	—		
	18	Yannik Dobler	Switzerland	58.19	22	DNF	—		
	21	Baptiste Silvestre	France	58.62	32	DNF	—		
	30	Joel Köhler	Germany	59.75	52	DNF	—		
	31	Adur Etxezarreta	Spain	57.11	6	DNF	—		
	33	Rastko Blagojević	Serbia	59.62	49	DNF	—		
	35	Odin Hjartarson	Sweden	58.22	24	DNF	—		
	41	Lukas Zippert	Switzerland	57.74	13	DNF	—		
	43	Daniel Paulus	Czech Republic	59.12	39	DNF	—		
	45	Yumenosuke Kakizaki	Japan	59.20	42	DNF	—		
	51	Aleksey Konkov	Russia	57.52	11	DNF	—		
	53	Martin Nardelli	France	1:00.43	57	DNF	—		
	57	Ibon Mintegui	Spain	59.49	47	DNF	—		
	59	Mihajlo Đorđević	Serbia	1:00.50	58	DNF	—		
	60	Felix Blanchard	Canada	59.30	44	DNF	—		
	15	Philip Lönnberg	Sweden	58.62	32	DSQ	—		
	29	Tim Siegmund	France	58.96	36	DNS	—		
	49	Stefan Pfannhauser	Austria	57.55	12	DNS	—		
	10	Filip Steinwall	Sweden	DNF	—				
	32	Simon Efimov	Russia	DNF	—				
