= Uzbekistan at the 1998 Winter Olympics =

- IOC code: UZB
- NOC: National Olympic Committee of the Republic of Uzbekistan
- Website: www.olympic.uz (in Uzbek and English)

in Nagano
- Competitors: 4 (2 men and 2 women) in 3 sports
- Flag bearer: Komil Urunbayev (alpine skiing)
- Medals: Gold 0 Silver 0 Bronze 0 Total 0

Winter Olympics appearances (overview)
- 1994; 1998; 2002; 2006; 2010; 2014; 2018; 2022; 2026; 2030

Other related appearances
- Soviet Union (1956–1988)

Uzbekistan competed at the 1998 Winter Olympics in Nagano, Japan.

== Competitors ==
The following is the list of number of competitors in the Games.

Sport	Men	Women	Total
Alpine skiing	1	0	1
Figure skating	1	1	2
Freestyle skiing	0	1	1
Total	2	2	4

== Alpine skiing ==
Men

Athlete	Event	Race 1	Race 2	Total	
Athlete	Event	Time	Time	Time	Rank
Komil Urunbayev	Slalom	1:09.55	1:09.30	2:18.85	28

== Figure skating ==
Tatyana Malinina placed eighth in ladies figure skating and Roman Skornyakow placed nineteenth in men's.

Men

Athlete	SP	FS	TFP	Rank
Roman Skorniakov	20	19	29.0	19

Women

Athlete	SP	FS	TFP	Rank
Tatyana Malinina	9	8	12.5	8

== Freestyle skiing ==
Women

Athlete	Event	Qualification		Final	
Athlete	Event	Points	Rank	Points	Rank
Lina Cheryazova	Aerials	154.02	13	did not advance	
