= Uzbekistan at the Olympics =

- IOC code: UZB
- NOC: National Olympic Committee of the Republic of Uzbekistan
- Website: www.olympic.uz (in Uzbek, Russian, and English)
- Medals Ranked 48th: Gold 19 Silver 8 Bronze 23 Total 50

Summer appearances
- 1996; 2000; 2004; 2008; 2012; 2016; 2020; 2024; 2028

Winter appearances
- 1994; 1998; 2002; 2006; 2010; 2014; 2018; 2022; 2026

Other related appearances
- Russian Empire (1900–1912); Soviet Union (1952–1988); Unified Team (1992)

Uzbekistan first participated at the Olympic Games as an independent nation in 1994, and has sent athletes to compete in every Games since then. Previously, Uzbek athletes competed as part of the Soviet Union from 1952 to 1988, and after the dissolution of the Soviet Union, Uzbekistan was part of the Unified Team in 1992.

At the 1996 Summer Olympics in Atlanta, Armen Bagdasarov earned the distinction of becoming the first athlete to win an Olympic medal for independent Uzbekistan, claiming silver in the men's judo middleweight division. Four years later, at the 2000 Summer Olympics in Sydney, Muhammad Abdullaev made history as the first Uzbek athlete to win Olympic gold, triumphing in the men’s light-welterweight boxing event. In the Winter Games, Uzbekistan debuted at the 1994 Olympic Winter Games in Lillehammer. During those Games, Lina Cheryazova captured gold in the women's freestyle skiing aerials, becoming both Uzbekistan’s first Winter Olympic medalist and the country’s first Olympic champion overall.

At the 2024 Paris Olympics, Uzbekistan achieved its most successful performance in history, securing a total of 13 medals: 8 gold, 2 silver, and 3 bronze, and finishing 13th overall among 206 participating countries. The nation dominated in men’s boxing, winning five gold medals, while judo, taekwondo, and freestyle wrestling also contributed significantly—including Diyora Keldiyorova making history as the first Uzbek woman to win Olympic gold at the Summer Games, triumphing in women's half lightweight judo event.

Uzbek athletes have won a total of forty nine medals at the Summer Olympic Games, mostly in wrestling, boxing and judo. The nation has also won a single medal at the Winter Olympic Games. The National Olympic Committee for Uzbekistan, National Olympic Committee of the Republic of Uzbekistan, was created in 1992 and recognized by the International Olympic Committee in 1993.

== Medal tables ==
=== Medals by Summer Games ===
| Games | Athletes | Gold | Silver | Bronze | Total | Rank |
|---|---|---|---|---|---|---|
| 1900–1912 | as part of the Russian Empire | | | | | |
| 1920–1948 | did not participate | | | | | |
| 1952–1988 | as part of the Soviet Union | | | | | |
| (Spain) 1992 Barcelona | as part of the Unified Team | | | | | |
| (United States) 1996 Atlanta | 71 | 0 | 1 | 1 | 2 | 58 |
| (Australia) 2000 Sydney | 70 | 1 | 1 | 2 | 4 | 43 |
| (Greece) 2004 Athens | 70 | 2 | 1 | 2 | 5 | 34 |
| (China) 2008 Beijing | 56 | 0 | 1 | 3 | 4 | 62 |
| (United Kingdom) 2012 London | 54 | 0 | 0 | 3 | 3 | 75 |
| (Brazil) 2016 Rio de Janeiro | 70 | 4 | 2 | 7 | 13 | 21 |
| (Japan) 2020 Tokyo | 67 | 3 | 0 | 2 | 5 | 32 |
| (France) 2024 Paris | 86 | 8 | 2 | 3 | 13 | 13 |
| (United States) 2028 Los Angeles | future event | | | | | |
| (Australia) 2032 Brisbane | future event | | | | | |
| Total (8/30) | 544 | 18 | 8 | 23 | 49 | 46 |

=== Medals by Winter Games ===
| Games | Athletes | Gold | Silver | Bronze | Total | Rank |
|---|---|---|---|---|---|---|
| 1956–1988 | as part of the Soviet Union | | | | | |
| (France) 1992 Albertville | as part of the Unified Team | | | | | |
| (Norway) 1994 Lillehammer | 7 | 1 | 0 | 0 | 1 | 14 |
| (Japan) 1998 Nagano | 4 | 0 | 0 | 0 | 0 | – |
| (United States) 2002 Salt Lake City | 6 | 0 | 0 | 0 | 0 | – |
| (Italy) 2006 Turin | 4 | 0 | 0 | 0 | 0 | – |
| (Canada) 2010 Vancouver | 3 | 0 | 0 | 0 | 0 | – |
| (Russia) 2014 Sochi | 3 | 0 | 0 | 0 | 0 | – |
| (South Korea) 2018 Pyeongchang | 2 | 0 | 0 | 0 | 0 | – |
| (China) 2022 Beijing | 1 | 0 | 0 | 0 | 0 | – |
| (Italy) 2026 Milano Cortina | 2 | 0 | 0 | 0 | 0 | – |
| (France) 2030 French Alps | future event | | | | | |
| (United States) 2034 Utah | future event | | | | | |
| Total (9/25) | 32 | 1 | 0 | 0 | 1 | 42 |

=== Medals by summer sport ===
| Sport | Gold | Silver | Bronze | Total |
|---|---|---|---|---|
| Boxing | 10 | 2 | 8 | 20 |
| Wrestling | 3 | 2 | 5 | 10 |
| Weightlifting | 2 | 1 | 1 | 4 |
| Taekwondo | 2 | 1 | 0 | 3 |
| Judo | 1 | 2 | 7 | 10 |
| Gymnastics | 0 | 0 | 2 | 2 |
| Totals (6 entries) | 18 | 8 | 23 | 49 |

=== Medals by winter sport ===
| Sport | Gold | Silver | Bronze | Total |
|---|---|---|---|---|
| Freestyle skiing | 1 | 0 | 0 | 1 |
| Totals (1 entries) | 1 | 0 | 0 | 1 |

== Medalists ==
=== Summer Olympics ===
| Medal | Name | Games | Sport | Event |
|---|---|---|---|---|
| Silver | Armen Bagdasarov | 1996 Atlanta | Judo | Men's 86 kg |
| Bronze | Karim Tulaganov | 1996 Atlanta | Boxing | Men's light middleweight |
| Gold | Mahammatkodir Abdoollayev | 2000 Sydney | Boxing | Men's light welterweight |
| Silver | Artur Taymazov | 2000 Sydney | Wrestling | Men's freestyle 130 kg |
| Bronze | Rustam Saidov | 2000 Sydney | Boxing | Men's super heavyweight |
| Bronze | Sergey Mihaylov | 2000 Sydney | Boxing | Men's light heavyweight |
| Gold | Artur Taymazov | 2004 Athens | Wrestling | Men's freestyle 120 kg |
| Gold | Alexandr Dokturishvili | 2004 Athens | Wrestling | Men's Greco-Roman 74 kg |
| Silver | Magomed Ibragimov | 2004 Athens | Wrestling | Men's freestyle 96 kg |
| Bronze | Bahodirjon Sooltonov | 2004 Athens | Boxing | Men's bantamweight |
| Bronze | Utkirbek Haydarov | 2004 Athens | Boxing | Men's light-heavyweight |
| Silver | Abdullo Tangriev | 2008 Beijing | Judo | Men's +100 kg |
| Bronze | Anton Fokin | 2008 Beijing | Gymnastics | Men's parallel bars |
| Bronze | Ekaterina Khilko | 2008 Beijing | Gymnastics | Women's trampoline |
| Bronze | Rishod Sobirov | 2008 Beijing | Judo | Men's 60 kg |
| Bronze | Abbos Atoev | 2012 London | Boxing | Men's middleweight |
| Bronze | Rishod Sobirov | 2012 London | Judo | Men's 60 kg |
| Bronze | Ivan Efremov | 2012 London | Weightlifting | Men's 105 kg |
| Gold | Hasanboy Dusmatov | 2016 Rio de Janeiro | Boxing | Men's light flyweight |
| Gold | Ruslan Nurudinov | 2016 Rio de Janeiro | Weightlifting | Men's 105 kg |
| Gold | Shakhobidin Zoirov | 2016 Rio de Janeiro | Boxing | Men's flyweight |
| Gold | Fazliddin Gaibnazarov | 2016 Rio de Janeiro | Boxing | Men's light welterweight |
| Silver | Shakhram Giyasov | 2016 Rio de Janeiro | Boxing | Men's 69 kg |
| Silver | Bektemir Melikuziev | 2016 Rio de Janeiro | Boxing | Men's middleweight |
| Bronze | Diyorbek Urozboev | 2016 Rio de Janeiro | Judo | Men's 60 kg |
| Bronze | Rishod Sobirov | 2016 Rio de Janeiro | Judo | Men's 66 kg |
| Bronze | Rustam Tulaganov | 2016 Rio de Janeiro | Boxing | Men's heavyweight |
| Bronze | Elmurat Tasmuradov | 2016 Rio de Janeiro | Wrestling | Men's Greco-Roman 59 kg |
| Bronze | Murodjon Akhmadaliev | 2016 Rio de Janeiro | Boxing | Men's bantamweight |
| Bronze | Ikhtiyor Navruzov | 2016 Rio de Janeiro | Wrestling | Men's freestyle 65 kg |
| Bronze | Magomed Ibragimov | 2016 Rio de Janeiro | Wrestling | Men's freestyle 97 kg |
| Gold | Ulugbek Rashitov | 2020 Tokyo | Taekwondo | Men's 68 kg |
| Gold | Akbar Djuraev | 2020 Tokyo | Weightlifting | Men's 109 kg |
| Gold | Bakhodir Jalolov | 2020 Tokyo | Boxing | Men's super heavyweight |
| Bronze | Davlat Bobonov | 2020 Tokyo | Judo | Men's 90 kg |
| Bronze | Bekzod Abdurakhmonov | 2020 Tokyo | Wrestling | Men's freestyle 74 kg |
| Gold | Hasanboy Dusmatov | 2024 Paris | Boxing | Men's 51 kg |
| Gold | Abdumalik Khalokov | 2024 Paris | Boxing | Men's 57 kg |
| Gold | Asadkhuja Muydinkhujaev | 2024 Paris | Boxing | Men's 71 kg |
| Gold | Lazizbek Mullojonov | 2024 Paris | Boxing | Men's 92 kg |
| Gold | Bakhodir Jalolov | 2024 Paris | Boxing | Men's +92 kg |
| Gold | Diyora Keldiyorova | 2024 Paris | Judo | Women's 52 kg |
| Gold | Ulugbek Rashitov | 2024 Paris | Taekwondo | Men's 68 kg |
| Gold | Razambek Zhamalov | 2024 Paris | Wrestling | Men's freestyle 74 kg |
| Silver | Svetlana Osipova | 2024 Paris | Taekwondo | Women's +67 kg |
| Silver | Akbar Djuraev | 2024 Paris | Weightlifting | Men's 102 kg |
| Bronze | Muzaffarbek Turoboyev | 2024 Paris | Judo | Men's 100 kg |
| Bronze | Alisher Yusupov | 2024 Paris | Judo | Men's +100 kg |
| Bronze | Gulomjon Abdullaev | 2024 Paris | Wrestling | Men's freestyle 57 kg |

=== Winter Olympics ===
| Medal | Name | Games | Sport | Event |
|---|---|---|---|---|
| Gold | Lina Cheryazova | 1994 Lillehammer | Freestyle skiing | Women's aerials |

== Change Medalists ==
1. Ivan Efremov from 4th place to bronze (Weightlifting at the 2012 Summer Olympics – Men's 105 kg)

== Disqualified Medalists ==
| Medal | Name | Sport | Event | Date |
|---|---|---|---|---|
| Silver | Soslan Tigiev | Wrestling | Men's 74 kg | 20 August 2008 |
| Gold | Artur Taymazov | Wrestling | Men's 120 kg | 21 August 2008 |
| Bronze | Soslan Tigiev | Wrestling | Men's 74 kg | 10 August 2012 |
| Gold | Artur Taymazov | Wrestling | Men's 120 kg | 11 August 2012 |

== See also ==
- Uzbekistan at the Paralympics
- List of flag bearers for Uzbekistan at the Olympics
- Category:Olympic competitors for Uzbekistan
