= Uzbekistan at the 2022 Winter Olympics =

- Flag of Uzbekistan
- IOC code: UZB
- NOC: National Olympic Committee of the Republic of Uzbekistan
- Website: www.olympic.uz (in Uzbek and English)

in Beijing, China 4–20 February 2022
- Competitors: 1 (1 man and 0 women) in 1 sport
- Flag bearer (opening): Komiljon Tukhtaev
- Flag bearer (closing): Volunteer
- Medals: Gold 0 Silver 0 Bronze 0 Total 0

Winter Olympics appearances (overview)
- 1994; 1998; 2002; 2006; 2010; 2014; 2018; 2022; 2026; 2030

Other related appearances
- Soviet Union (1956–1988)

Uzbekistan competed at the 2022 Winter Olympics in Beijing, China, from 4 to 20 February 2022.

The Uzbek team consisted of one male alpine skier.

Komiljon Tukhtaev was the country's flagbearer during the opening ceremony. Meanwhile a volunteer was the flagbearer during the closing ceremony.

== Competitors ==
The following is the list of number of competitors participating at the Games per sport/discipline.

Sport	Men	Women	Total
Alpine skiing	1	0	1
Total	1	0	1

== Alpine skiing ==
By meeting the basic qualification standards Uzbekistan qualified one male alpine skier.

Athlete	Event	Run 1		Run 2		Total	
Athlete	Event	Time	Rank	Time	Rank	Time	Rank
Komiljon Tukhtaev	Men's giant slalom	1:12.77	35	1:14.72	27	2:27.49	29
Komiljon Tukhtaev	Men's slalom	DSQ		did not advance			
