= Figure skating at the 1994 Winter Olympics – Ice dance =

Ice dance at the XVII Olympic Winter Games
- Venue: Hamar Olympic Amphitheatre
- Dates: 18–21 February 1994
- Competitors: 42 (21 pairs) from 16 nations

Medalists
1st place, gold medalist(s)		Oksana Grishuk; Evgeni Platov	Russia
2nd place, silver medalist(s)		Maya Usova; Alexander Zhulin	Russia
3rd place, bronze medalist(s)		Jayne Torvill; Christopher Dean	Great Britain

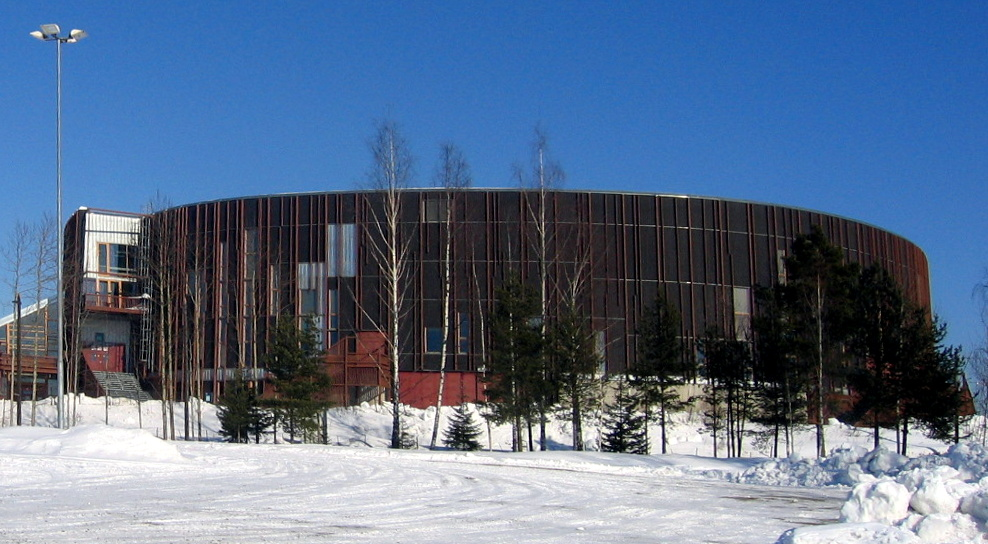
The figure skating events at the 1994 Winter Olympics were held at the Hamar Olympic Amphitheatre in Hamar, Norway.

Ice dance at the 1994 Winter Olympics was contested between 18 and 21 February 1994. There were 21 dancing couples from 16 nations that participated. Oksana Grishuk and Evgeni Platov won the gold medal for Russia, and their teammates Maya Usova and Alexander Zhulin won the silver medal. The 1984 Olympic champions, Jayne Torvill and Christopher Dean, won the bronze medal for Great Britain.

== Background ==
Elizabeth Punsalan and Jerod Swallow of the United States competed at the 1994 Winter Olympics just two weeks after Punsalan's father Ernesto was stabbed to death by her younger brother.

== Results ==
=== Overall ===
Ice dance results
Rank	Team	Nation	Total	CD1	CD2	OD	FD
1st place, gold medalist(s)	Oksana Grishuk; Evgeni Platov	Russia	3.4	2	1	3	1
2nd place, silver medalist(s)	Maya Usova; Alexander Zhulin	Russia	3.8	1	2	2	2
3rd place, bronze medalist(s)	Jayne Torvill; Christopher Dean	Great Britain	4.8	3	3	1	3
4	Susanna Rahkamo / Petri Kokko	Finland	8.0	4	4	4	4
5	Sophie Moniotte / Pascal Lavanchy	France	10.0	5	5	5	5
6	Anjelika Krylova / Vladimir Fedorov	Russia	12.0	6	6	6	6
7	Irina Romanova / Igor Yaroshenko	Ukraine	14.0	7	7	7	7
8	Kateřina Mrázová / Martin Šimeček	Czech Republic	16.0	8	8	8	8
9	Jennifer Goolsbee / Hendryk Schamberger	Germany	18.0	9	9	9	9
10	Shae-Lynn Bourne / Victor Kraatz	Canada	20.0	10	10	10	10
11	Tatiana Navka / Samvel Gezalian	Belarus	22.0	11	11	11	11
12	Margarita Drobiazko / Povilas Vanagas	Lithuania	24.4	13	13	12	12
13	Aliki Stergiadu / Juris Razgulajevs	Uzbekistan	25.0	12	12	12	13
14	Bérangère Nau / Luc Monéger	France	29.0	15	15	15	14
15	Elizabeth Punsalan / Jerod Swallow	United States	29.0	14	14	14	15
16	Radmila Chroboková / Milan Brzý	Czech Republic	32.0	16	16	16	16
17	Agnieszka Domańska / Marcin Głowacki	Poland	35.0	18	18	18	17
18	Elizaveta Stekolnikova / Dmitri Kazarlyga	Kazakhstan	35.0	17	17	17	18
19	Svitlana Chernikova / Oleksandr Sosnenko	Ukraine	38.0	19	19	19	19
20	Enikő Berkes / Szilárd Tóth	Hungary	40.0	20	20	20	20
21	Dinara Nurdbayeva / Muslim Sattarov	Uzbekistan	42.0	21	21	21	21
