= Uzbekistan at the 2006 Winter Olympics =

- IOC code: UZB
- NOC: National Olympic Committee of the Republic of Uzbekistan
- Website: www.olympic.uz (in Uzbek and English)

in Turin
- Competitors: 4 (2 men, 2 women) in 2 sports
- Flag bearers: Kayrat Ermetov (opening and closing)
- Medals: Gold 0 Silver 0 Bronze 0 Total 0

Winter Olympics appearances (overview)
- 1994; 1998; 2002; 2006; 2010; 2014; 2018; 2022; 2026

Other related appearances
- Soviet Union (1956–1988)

Uzbekistan competed at the 2006 Winter Olympics in Turin, Italy.

== Alpine skiing ==
Kayrat Ermetov finished second-to-last in the men's slalom, seventeen seconds behind the event's winner, Benjamin Raich.

Athlete	Event	Final				
Athlete	Event	Run 1	Run 2	Run 3	Total	Rank
Kayrat Ermetov	Men's slalom	1:13.19	1:07.69	n/a	2:20.88	46

== Figure skating ==
The 16th-place finish from the pairs team of Marina Aganina and Artem Knyazev was the highest for Uzbekistan in Turin.

Athlete	Event	CD		SP/OD		FS/FD		Total	
Athlete	Event	Points	Rank	Points	Rank	Points	Rank	Points	Rank
Anastasia Gimazetdinova	Ladies'	n/a		38.44	29	did not advance			29
Marina Aganina; Artem Knyazev	Pairs	n/a		44.02	15	75.53	17	119.55	16

Key: CD = Compulsory Dance, FD = Free Dance, FS = Free Skate, OD = Original Dance, SP = Short Program
