= Dinara Nurdbayeva =

Uzbekistani ice dancer

Personal information
- Other names: Dinara Nurdbaeva
- Born: 24 July 1976 (age 49) Tashkent, Uzbek SSR, Soviet Union
- Height: 1.65 m (5 ft 5 in)

Figure skating career
- Country: Uzbekistan
- Partner: Muslim Sattarov

Dinara Nurdbayeva (born 24 July 1976) is an Uzbekistani former competitive ice dancer. With her skating partner, Muslim Sattarov, she represented Uzbekistan at the 1994 Winter Olympics in Lillehammer, placing 21st in the ice dance category.

== Competitive highlights ==
with Sattarov

International
| Event | 1994 |
|---|---|
| Winter Olympics | 21st |
| World Championships | 33rd |
