= Alpine skiing at the 2019 Winter Universiade – Men's super-G =

Men's super-G at the XXIX Winter Universiade
- Venues: Bobrovy Log
- Dates: 3 March
- Competitors: 63 from 25 nations
- Winning time: 57.04

Medalists
1st place, gold medalist(s)		Lukas Zippert	Switzerland
2nd place, silver medalist(s)		Tomáš Klinský	Czech Republic
3rd place, bronze medalist(s)		Yannick Chabloz	Switzerland

The men's super-G competition of the 2019 Winter Universiade was held at Bobrovy Log, Krasnoyarsk, Russia on 3 March 2019.

== Results ==
The race was started at 13:00.

Rank	Bib	Name	Country	Time	Difference
1st place, gold medalist(s)	3	Lukas Zippert	Switzerland	57.04	
2nd place, silver medalist(s)	13	Tomáš Klinský	Czech Republic	57.24	+0.20
3rd place, bronze medalist(s)	8	Yannick Chabloz	Switzerland	57.33	+0.29
4	4	Filip Steinwall	Sweden	57.39	+0.35
5	10	Arnaud Boisset	Switzerland	57.40	+0.36
6	15	Adur Etxezarreta	Spain	57.55	+0.51
7	11	Ven Florjančič	Slovenia	57.57	+0.53
8	19	Andrzej Dziedzic	Poland	57.88	+0.84
9	33	Paweł Babicki	Poland	57.98	+0.94
10	14	Ivan Kuznetsov	Russia	58.03	+0.99
11	9	Stefan Pfannhauser	Austria	58.09	+1.05
12	7	Yannik Dobler	Switzerland	58.12	+1.08
13	2	Jan Zabystřan	Czech Republic	58.23	+1.19
14	12	Paul Perrier	France	58.33	+1.29
15	6	Odin Hjartatson	Sweden	58.51	+1.47
16	22	Gian-Andrea Hehli	Switzerland	58.60	+1.56
17	43	Tim Siegmund	Germany	58.67	+1.63
18	35	Szymon Bebenek	Poland	58.75	+1.71
19	39	Martin Hyška	Slovakia	58.77	+1.73
20	55	Alexandre Coltier	France	58.97	+1.93
21	18	Nikita Alekhin	Russia	59.13	+2.09
22	26	Sebastiano Andreis	Italy	59.16	+2.12
23	17	Thomas Volgger	Austria	59.20	+2.16
24	1	Arne Ackermann	Switzerland	59.21	+2.17
25	27	Pavel Zapletin	Russia	59.24	+2.20
26	37	Benjamin Szollos	Israel	59.31	+2.27
27	57	Loïc Baudin	France	59.37	+2.33
28	58	Manuel Hug	Liechtenstein	59.39	+2.35
29	21	Jan Skořepa	Czech Republic	59.46	+2.42
30	56	Olaf Borsboom	Netherlands	59.58	+2.54
31	53	Antoni Szczepanik	Poland	59.71	+2.67
32	41	Yumenosuke Kakizaki	Japan	59.75	+2.71
33	36	Philip Lönnberg	Sweden	59.78	+2.74
34	25	Henrich Katrenič	Slovakia	59.80	+2.76
35	40	Yohei Koyama	Japan	59.84	+2.80
36	42	Denis Vorobev	Russia	59.86	+2.82
37	54	Felix Blanchard	Canada	59.92	+2.88
38	34	Baptiste Silvestre	France	59.99	+2.95
39	44	Hayata Wakatsuki	Japan	1:00.02	+2.98
40	48	Joel Köhler	Germany	1:00.05	+3.01
41	28	Miks Zvejnieks	Latvia	1:00.13	+3.09
42	38	Matevž Rupnik	Slovenia	1:00.15	+3.11
43	46	Dominik Bialobrzycki	Poland	1:00.19	+3.15
43	23	Daniel Paulus	Czech Republic	1:00.19	+3.15
45	50	Alexandre Fortin	Canada	1:00.20	+3.16
45	31	Daniil Simonov	Russia	1:00.20	+3.16
45	29	Ibon Mintegui	Spain	1:00.20	+3.16
48	32	Kim Dong-woo	South Korea	1:00.32	+3.28
49	62	Jean-Christophe Allard	Canada	1:00.35	+3.31
50	30	Paco Rassat	France	1:00.62	+3.58
51	45	Rastko Blagojević	Serbia	1:00.87	+3.83
52	60	Tomas Bacigalupo	Argentina	1:00.89	+3.85
53	63	Lovro Široki	Croatia	1:01.17	+4.13
54	39	Leo Lamon	Belgium	1:01.28	+4.24
55	51	Mihajlo Đorđević	Serbia	1:01.55	+4.51
56	52	Zakhar Kuchin	Kazakhstan	1:01.59	+4.55
57	49	Michał Staszowski	Czech Republic	1:01.62	+4.58
58	47	Dāvis Zvejnieks	Latvia	1:02.02	+4.98
59	61	Sten-Mark Virro	Estonia	1:02.24	+5.20
	16	Tommaso Canclini	Italy	Did not finish	
	24	Martin Stepan	Czech Republic	Did not finish	
	5	Aleksey Konkov	Russia	Disqualified	
	20	Davide Baruffaldi	Italy	Disqualified	
