= Oybek Kasimov =

Secretary General of the NOC of Uzbekistan

Oybek Kasimov Ойбек Касимов
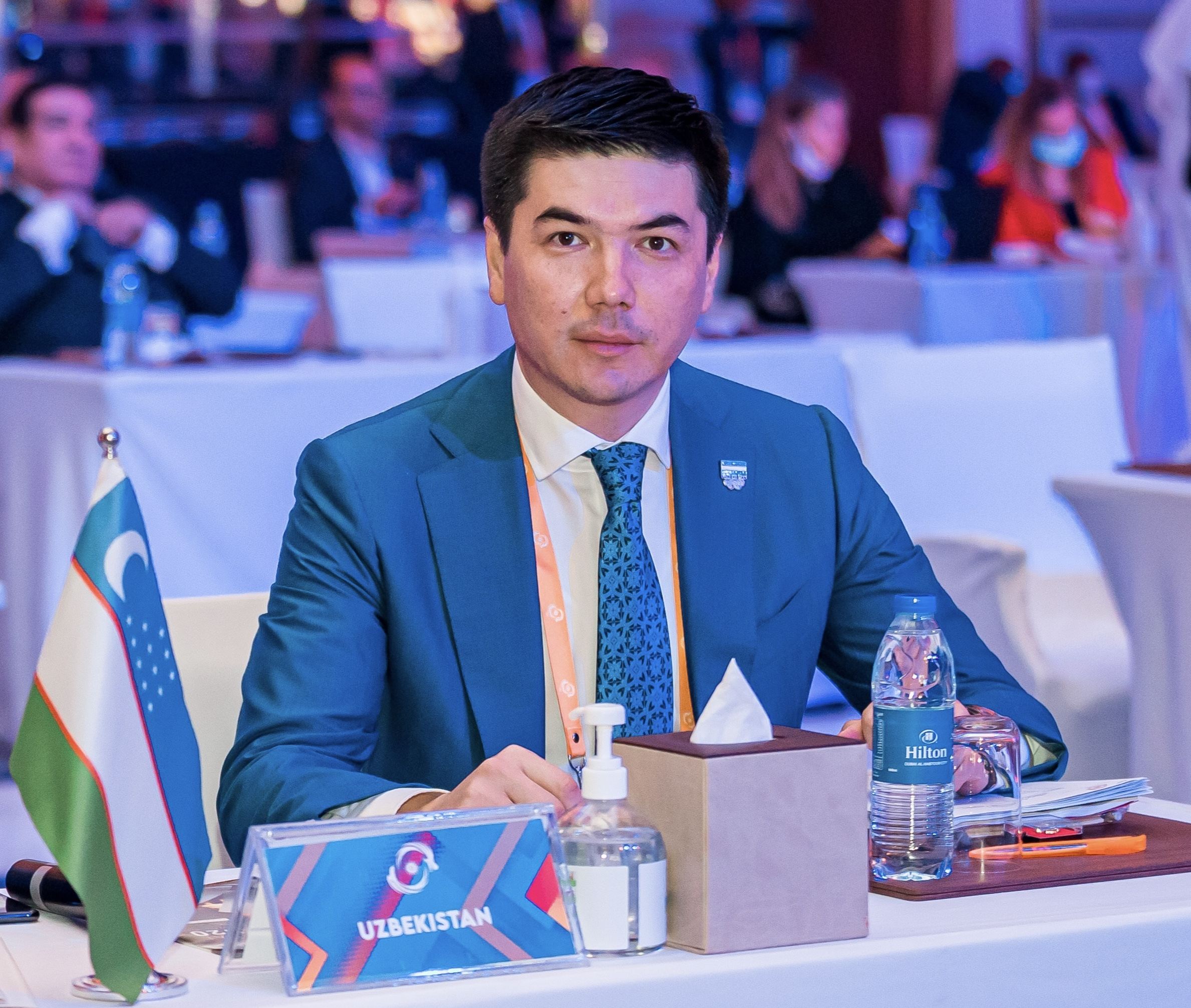

Secretary General of the National Olympic Committee of the Republic of Uzbekistan
- Incumbent
- Assumed office 2020
- Preceded by: Jasur Matchanov

First Deputy Minister of Physical Culture and Sports of the Republic of Uzbekistan
- In office 2018–2020

Secretary General of the National Olympic Committee of the Republic of Uzbekistan
- In office 2012–2018
- Preceded by: Muhammadali Karimov
- Succeeded by: Jasur Matchanov

Personal details
- Born: Oybek Omilovich Kasimov; August 26, 1980 (age 46) Tashkent, Uzbek SSR, Soviet Union (now Uzbekistan)
- Education: University of World Economy and Diplomacy (bachelor and master degree)

Oybek Omilovich Kasimov (Uzbek Latin: Oybek Omilovich Kasimov, Uzbek Cyrillic: ru:Касимов, Ойбек Омилович, 26 August 1980) is currently the Secretary General of the National Olympic Committee of the Republic of Uzbekistan.

== Biography ==
In 1999-2006, Kasimov served as Legal Counsel of the State Joint Stock Company "Uzprommashimpex" of the Ministry of Foreign Economic Relations of the Republic of Uzbekistan. In 2006-2010, he was First deputy general director and then the general director of the Pakhtakor Tashkent FK. In 2010-2012, he was First Vice-President of the Tashkent City Football Federation. In 2012-2018, he was Secretary General of the National Olympic Committee of the Republic of Uzbekistan In 2018-2020, he was First Deputy Minister of Physical Culture and Sports of the Republic of Uzbekistan. In 2020, he was Secretary General of the National Olympic Committee of the Republic of Uzbekistan

== See also ==
- Sports in Uzbekistan
