= Areso =

Coordinates: 43°05′N 1°57′W

- Aresomapa, Navarre
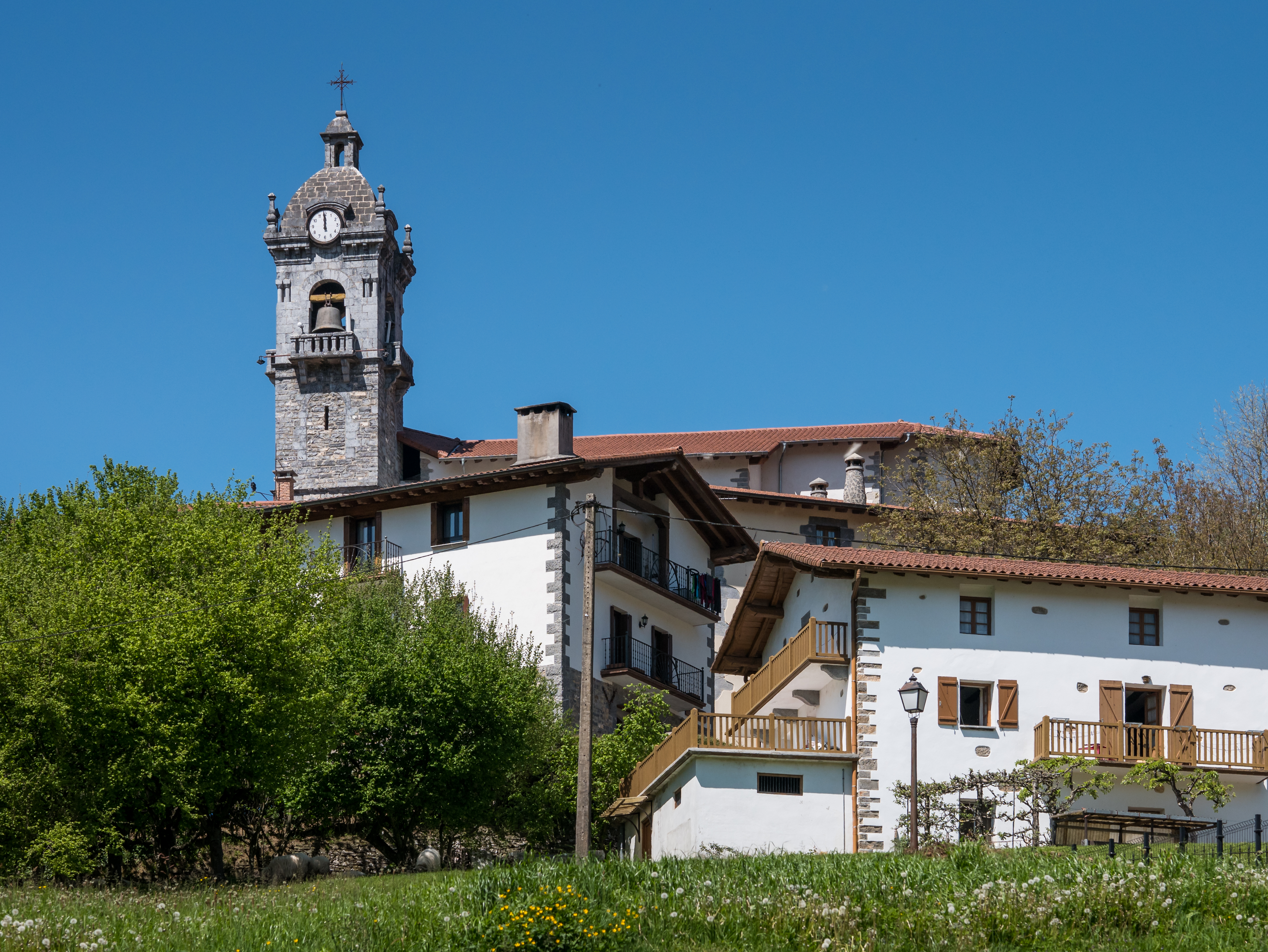
- Church in Areso

- Coat of arms

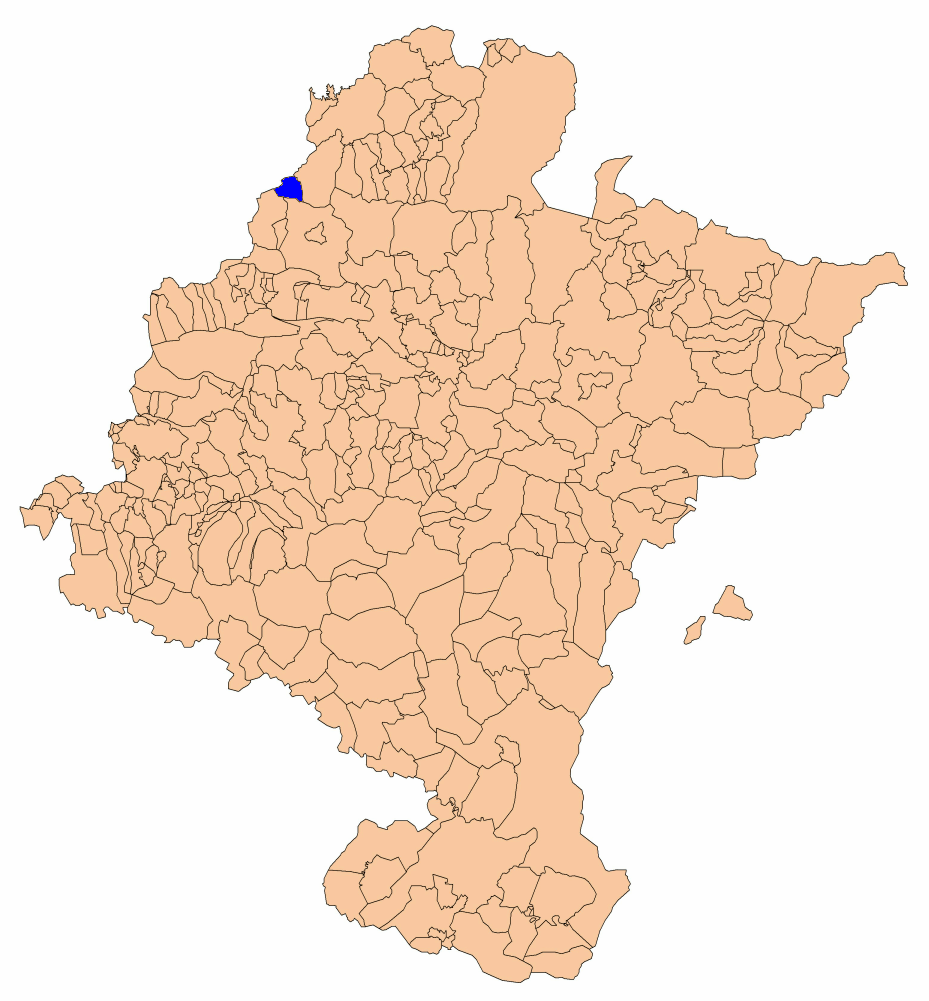
- Map of Areso
- Country: Spain

Areso is a town and municipality located in the province and autonomous community of Navarre, northern Spain.
