= Tashkent State Transport University =

University in Tashkent, Uzbekistan

Coordinates: 41.277°N 69.282°E

- Former names: Tashkent State Transport University (TSTU)
- Established: 2020
- Rector: Abdurakhmanov Odil Kalandarovich (Doctor of Economics)
- Location: Tashkent, Uzbekistan
- Website: www.tstu.uz

Tashkent State Transport University (TSTU) is a university in Uzbekistan.

== History ==
Tashkent State Transport University was founded in 2020 and headquartered in Tashkent, Uzbekistan.

In May 2020 the Tashkent Institute of Railway Engineers, Tashkent Institute of Design, Construction and Maintenance of Automobile Roads and the Faculty of Aerospace Technology of Tashkent State Technical University were merged into the Tashkent State Transport University. The university includes 8 faculties and 39 departments.

With more than 90 years of history 200 thousand highly qualified specialists with higher and secondary professional education graduated from the university. They successfully work in transport and in other economic sectors in Uzbekistan and other countries.

== The main tasks and functions of the university ==
- Training, retraining and qualifying competitive higher education specialists and scientific-pedagogical staff;
- Carrying out fundamental, practical and innovative research and studies on the key issues of transport development, implementing the results and putting forward proposals on widespread introduction of digital and other modern technologies;
- Developing cooperation with leading foreign higher education and research institutions in order to implement joint educational programs and research projects, improve the skills of university professors and organize the study of graduates in doctorate degrees abroad;
- Creating a continuous system of training for the transport sector, ensuring the continuity and flow of educational programs in the academic lyceums and professional educational institutions of the field;
- Organizing student internships in relevant organizations, establishing targeted cooperation for the employment of graduates together with organizations in the field of transport in order to provide an inextricable connection of theoretical training with practice.

== Faculties ==
- Faculty of Railway transport engineering;
- Faculty of Electrical Engineering and computer engineering;
- Faculty of Economics;
- Faculty of construction;
- Faculty of Aviation transport engineering;
- Faculty and Departments;
- Faculty of Transportation Systems Management;
- Faculty of Automotive engineering.
