= Uzbekistan at the 2010 Winter Olympics =

- IOC code: UZB
- NOC: National Olympic Committee of the Republic of Uzbekistan
- Website: www.olympic.uz (in Uzbek and English)

in Vancouver
- Competitors: 3 in 2 sports
- Flag bearers: Oleg Shamaev (Opening and Closing)
- Medals: Gold 0 Silver 0 Bronze 0 Total 0

Winter Olympics appearances (overview)
- 1994; 1998; 2002; 2006; 2010; 2014; 2018; 2022; 2026

Other related appearances
- Soviet Union (1956–1988)

Uzbekistan sent a delegation to compete at the 2010 Winter Olympics in Vancouver, British Columbia, Canada, from 12–28 February 2010. This was the country's fifth appearance in a Winter Olympic Games. The delegation consisted of three athletes: Kseniya Grigoreva and Oleg Shamaev in alpine skiing, and Anastasia Gimazetdinova in figure skating. None of the Uzbekistani competitors won a medal at these Olympics.

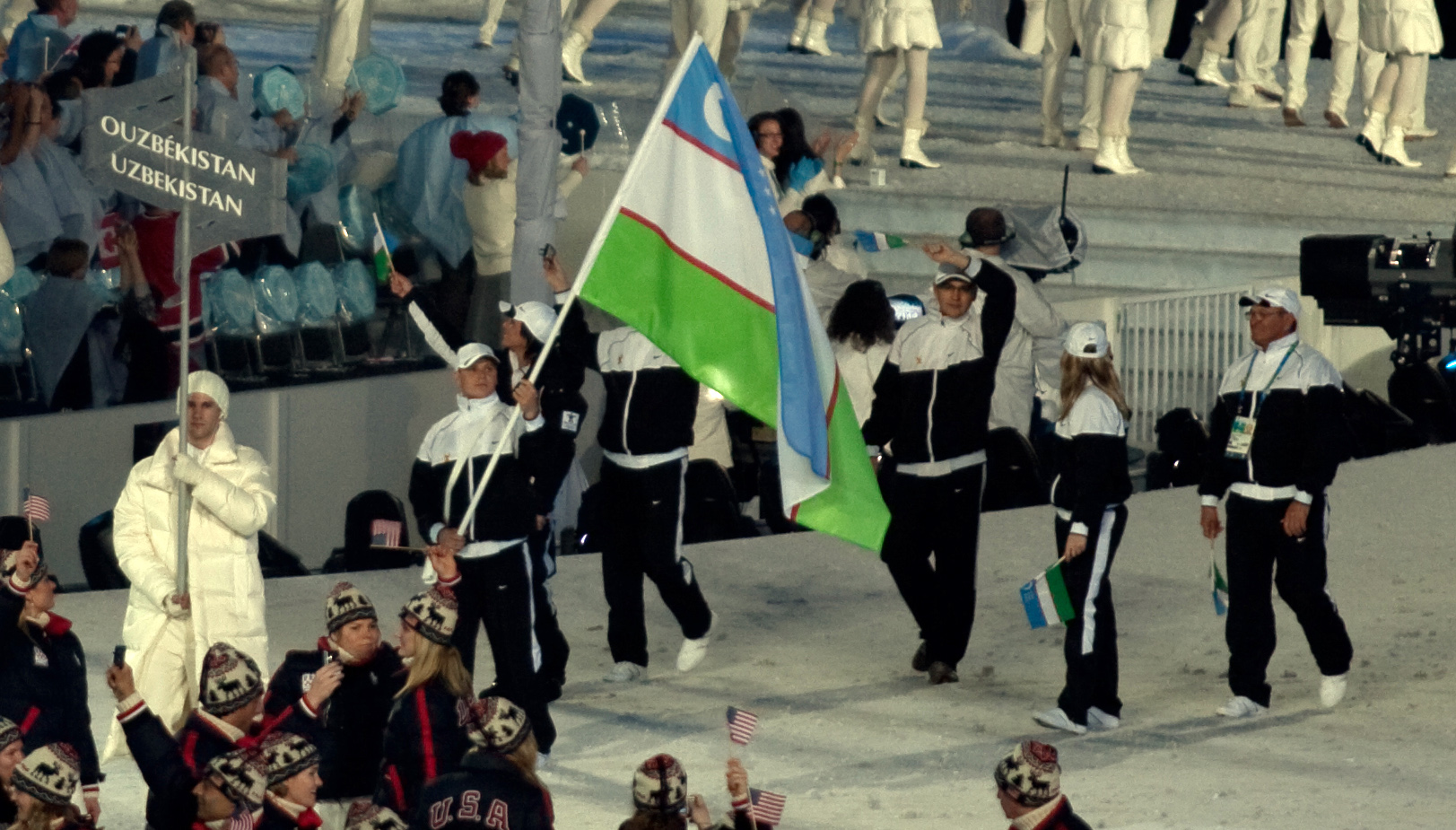
The athletes entering the stadium during the opening ceremonies.

== Background ==
Uzbekistan became an independent country in 1991 following the dissolution of the Soviet Union, and competed with the Unified Team made up of several former Soviet Republics during the 1992 Winter and Summer Olympics. The National Olympic Committee of the Republic of Uzbekistan was recognized by the International Olympic Committee in 1993, and beginning with the 1994 Winter Olympics Uzbekistan began competing as an independent country. The country has participated in every Olympics, Summer and Winter, since 1994. The only Uzbekistani Winter Olympics medal was won by Lina Cheryazova, a freestyle skier, in 1994 in Lillehammer, Norway. The delegation sent to Vancouver in 2010 consisted of three competitors; two alpine skiers, Kseniya Grigoreva and Oleg Shamaev, and one figure skater, Anastasia Gimazetdinova. Shamaev was chosen as the flag bearer for both the opening ceremony and the closing ceremony.

== Alpine skiing ==
Kseniya Grigoreva was 22 years old at the time she competed in the Vancouver Olympics. She was entered into two events, the women's slalom and giant slalom. In the giant slalom, held from 24–25 February due to bad weather, she posted run times of 1 minute and 31 seconds and, the next day, 1 minute and 25 seconds. Her combined time was 2 minutes and 57 seconds, which ranked her 58th out of 60 competitors who finished both runs of the race. On 26 February, she failed to finish the first leg of the race in the slalom.

Oleg Shamaev, who was 27 years old at the time, took part in the men's giant slalom and the slalom. The giant slalom was held on 23 February, and Shamaev posted run times of 1 minute and 32 seconds and 1 minute and 36 seconds. His combined time ranked him 77th out of 81 competitors who finished both legs of the race. On 27 February, he participated in the slalom, posting run times of 57 seconds and 1 minute. His combined time placed him 42nd out of 48 competitors who finished both runs of the race.

Athlete	Event	Run 1	Run 2	Total	Rank
Oleg Shamaev	Men's giant slalom	1:32.20	1:36.98	3:09.18	77
Oleg Shamaev	Men's slalom	57.65	1:00.40	1:58.05	42
Kseniya Grigoreva	Women's slalom	DNF			
Kseniya Grigoreva	Women's giant slalom	1:31.59	1:25.63	2:57.22	58

== Figure skating ==
Anastasia Gimazetdinova was 29 years old at the time of the Vancouver Olympics, and was the oldest competitor in the ladies' singles. She had previously competed for Uzbekistan at the 2006 Winter Olympics, finishing in 29th place in the short program, and not advancing to the second stage of Olympic competition, the free skate. In Vancouver, she scored a 49.02 for her short program, which put her in 24th place, the last position to qualify for the free skate. Gimazetdinova scored an 82.63 on her free skate, placing her 23rd in that round. Her total score, the sum of the short and free programs, was 131.65, placing her 23rd for the competition.

Athlete(s)	Event	Short program		Free skating		Total	
Athlete(s)	Event	Points	Rank	Points	Rank	Points	Rank
Anastasia Gimazetdinova	Ladies'	49.02	24	82.63	23	131.65	23

== See also ==
- Uzbekistan at the Olympics
- Uzbekistan at the 2014 Winter Paralympics
