= Oleksandr Sosnenko =

Ukrainian ice dancer

Personal information
- Native name: Олександр Сосненко
- Other names: Alexander Sosnenko; Aleksandr Sosnenko
- Born: 9 November 1971 (age 54)

Figure skating career
- Country: Ukraine
- Partner: Svitlana Chernikova
- Coach: Halyna Churilova
- Retired: c. 1995

Oleksandr Sosnenko (Ukrainian: Олександр Сосненко; born 9 November 1971) is a Ukrainian former competitive ice dancer. With Svitlana Chernikova, he won silver at the 1994 Prague Skate and at the 1994 Ukrainian Championships. The two competed at the 1994 Winter Olympics in Lillehammer, placing 19th. They were coached by Halyna Churilova.

Sosnenko has worked as a skating coach in Kyiv.

== Competitive highlights ==
with Chernikova

International
Event	1993–94	1994–95
Winter Olympics	19th	
European Championships	22nd	
Prague Skate		2nd
International de Paris / Trophée de France	9th	10th
National
Ukrainian Championships	2nd	
