= Uzbekistan at the 2026 Winter Olympics =

- Flag of Uzbekistan
- IOC code: UZB
- NOC: National Olympic Committee of the Republic of Uzbekistan
- Website: www.olympic.uz (in Uzbek and English)

in Milan and Cortina d'Ampezzo, Italy 6 February 2026 – 22 February 2026
- Competitors: 2 (2 men) in 2 sports
- Flag bearer (opening): Daniil Eybog
- Flag bearer (closing): Volunteer
- Medals: Gold 0 Silver 0 Bronze 0 Total 0

Winter Olympics appearances (overview)
- 1994; 1998; 2002; 2006; 2010; 2014; 2018; 2022; 2026

Other related appearances
- Soviet Union (1956–1988)

Uzbekistan competed at the 2026 Winter Olympics in Milan and Cortina d'Ampezzo, Italy, from 6 to 22 February 2026. This was the country's ninth appearance at the Winter Olympics, after its debut in 1994.

The Uzbek team consisted of two male athletes competing in two sports. Short track speed skater Daniil Eybog was the country's flagbearer during the opening ceremony. Meanwhile, a volunteer was the country's flagbearer during the closing ceremony.

== Competitors ==
The following is the list of number of competitors participating at the Games per sport/discipline.

Sport	Men	Women	Total
Alpine skiing	1	0	1
Short-track speed skating	1	0	1
Total	2	0	2

== Alpine skiing ==
Uzbekistan qualified one male alpine skier through the basic quota.

Athlete	Event	Run 1		Run 2		Total	
Athlete	Event	Time	Rank	Time	Rank	Time	Rank
Medet Nazarov	Men's giant slalom	1:25.75	54	1:21.14	58	2:46.89	50
Medet Nazarov	Men's slalom	1:07.51	34	DNF			

== Short-track speed skating ==
Uzbekistan qualified one male short-track speed skater after the conclusion of the 2025–26 ISU Short Track World Tour. This will mark the country's sport debut at the Winter Olympics. Daniil Eybog represented the country. Eybog originally competed for Russia, but switched to compete for Uzbekistan because of restrictions placed on Russian athletes due to the war in Ukraine.

Athlete	Event	Heat		Quarterfinal		Semifinal		Final	
Athlete	Event	Time	Rank	Time	Rank	Time	Rank	Time	Rank
Daniil Eybog	Men's 500 m	1:01.577	3 ADV	1:07.497	5	Did not advance			19
Daniil Eybog	Men's 1500 m	—N/a		2:16.963	3 Q	2:18.000	3 QB	2:35.103	14

== Non-competing sports ==
=== Figure skating ===
At the 2025 World Figure Skating Championships in Boston, the United States, Uzbekistan secured one quota for a team in pairs skating. However, the country declined the quota spot after the male athlete in the pairs was injured and could not recover in time.
