= List of IFBB member federations =

This is a list of federations that are members of the International Federation of Bodybuilding and Fitness (IFBB). As of December 2015, the IFBB has over 190 national federation members. In some countries there may be more than one local bodybuilding organization; however, the IFBB chooses only one per nation to represent the IFBB for that respective country.

== Continental federations ==
Four different continental federations exist that each national federation can choose to be a part of.

== National federations ==
IFBB Recognized Continental and National Federations
Continental Federation	National Federation
Asian Federation of Bodybuilding and Fitness (AFBF)	Afghanistan; Australia; Bahrain; Bangladesh; Brunei; China; Chinese Taipei; Hong Kong; India; Iran; Iraq; Japan; Jordan; Kazakhstan; Kyrgyzstan; Kuwait; Lebanon; Mongolia; Nepal; New Zealand; Oman; Pakistan; Palestine; Philippines; Qatar; Saudi Arabia; Singapore; South Korea; Sri Lanka; Syria; Turkmenistan; UAE; Uzbekistan; Yemen
European Bodybuilding and Fitness Federation (EBFF)	Albania; Andorra; Armenia; Austria; Belarus; Belgium; Bosnia and Herzegovina; Bulgaria; Croatia; Czech Republic; Cyprus; Denmark; Estonia; Finland; France; Germany; Gibraltar; Greece; Hungary; Iceland; Israel; Italy; Latvia; Lithuania; Luxembourg; Macedonia; Malta; Moldova; Montenegro; Netherlands; Norway; Poland; Portugal; Romania; Russia; Serbia; Slovakia; Slovenia; Spain; Sweden; Switzerland; Turkey; Ukraine; United Kingdom
Central and Caribbean Bodybuilding & Fitness Federation (CACBBFF)	Anguilla; Antigua & Barbuda; Aruba; Bahamas; Barbados; Belize; Bermuda; British Virgin Islands; Cayman Islands; Colombia; Costa Rica; Cuba; Curaçao; Dominica; Dominican Republic; El Salvador; Grenada; Guatemala; Guyana; Haiti; Honduras; Jamaica; Martinique; Mexico; Montserrat; Nicaragua; Panama; Puerto Rico; St. Eustatius; St. Kitts-Nevis; St. Lucia; St. Maarten (Dutch); St. Martin (French); St. Vincent & the Grenadines; Turks & Caicos Islands; Trinidad & Tobago; Venezuela; Virgin Islands
South American Bodybuilding and Fitness Federation (CSFF)	Argentina; Aruba; Bolivia; Brazil; Chile; Colombia; Ecuador; Paraguay; Peru; Uruguay; Venezuela
IFBB Federation USA (IFBB USA)	• United States
IFBB Canada	• Canada
