= Uzbekistan at the 1994 Winter Olympics =

- IOC code: UZB
- NOC: National Olympic Committee of the Republic of Uzbekistan
- Website: www.olympic.uz (in Uzbek and English)

in Lillehammer
- Competitors: 7 (3 men and 4 women) in 2 sports
- Flag bearer: Sergey Brener
- Medals Ranked 14th: Gold 1 Silver 0 Bronze 0 Total 1

Winter Olympics appearances (overview)
- 1994; 1998; 2002; 2006; 2010; 2014; 2018; 2022; 2026; 2030

Other related appearances
- Soviet Union (1956–1988)

Uzbekistan competed in the Winter Olympic Games as an independent nation for the first time at the 1994 Winter Olympics in Lillehammer, Norway. Previously, Uzbek athletes competed for the Unified Team at the 1992 Winter Olympics.

== Medalists ==
Medal	Name	Sport	Event	Date
Gold	Lina Cheryazova	Freestyle skiing	Women's aerials	24 February

== Competitors ==
The following is the list of number of competitors in the Games.

Sport	Men	Women	Total
Figure skating	2	2	4
Freestyle skiing	1	2	3
Total	3	4	7

== Figure skating ==
Ice Dancing

Athlete	Final								
Athlete	Compulsory Dance 1	Rank	Compulsory Dance 2	Rank	Original Dance	Rank	Free Dance	Total	Rank
Aliki Sergaadu; Yuris Razgulyayev	2.4	12	2.4	12	7.2	12	13.0	25.0	13
Dinara Nurdbayeva; Muslim Sattarov	4.2	21	4.2	21	12.6	21	21.0	42.0	21

== Freestyle skiing ==
Men

Athlete	Event	Qualifying		Final	
Athlete	Event	Points	Rank	Points	Rank
Sergey Brener	Aerials	159.93	19	Did Not Advance	

Women

Athlete	Event	Qualifying		Final	
Athlete	Event	Points	Rank	Points	Rank
Lina Cheryazova	Aerials	144.43	12 Q	166.84	1st place, gold medalist(s)
Larisa Udodova	Moguls	20.28	21	Did Not Advance	

== Sources ==
- Official Olympic Reports
- International Olympic Committee results database
- sports-reference
