= Uzbekistan at the 2018 Winter Olympics =

- Flag of Uzbekistan
- IOC code: UZB
- NOC: National Olympic Committee of the Republic of Uzbekistan
- Website: www.olympic.uz (in Uzbek and English)

in PyeongChang, South Korea February 9–25, 2018
- Competitors: 2 in 2 sports
- Flag bearer: Komiljon Tukhtaev (opening)
- Medals: Gold 0 Silver 0 Bronze 0 Total 0

Winter Olympics appearances (overview)
- 1994; 1998; 2002; 2006; 2010; 2014; 2018; 2022; 2026

Other related appearances
- Soviet Union (1956–1988)

Uzbekistan competed in the 2018 Winter Olympics in Pyeongchang, South Korea, from 9 to 25 February 2018. The country's participation in Pyeongchang marked its seventh appearance in the Winter Olympics.

Uzbekistan was represented by two athletes who competed across two sports. Komiljon Tukhtaev served as the country's flag-bearer during the opening ceremony and a volunteer carried the flag during the closing ceremony. Uzbekistan did not win any medals in the Games.

== Background ==
The National Olympic Committee of the Republic of Uzbekistan was formed in 1992 and recognized by the International Olympic Committee in 1993. The nation made its participation as a part of Soviet Union previously. It made its first Olympics appearance as an independent nation at the 1992 Summer Olympics. The current edition marked its seventh appearance at the Winter Games.

The 2018 Winter Olympics were held in Pyeongchang, South Korea between 9 and 25 February 2018. Uzbekistan was represented by a lone athlete. Komiljon Tukhtaev served as the country's flag-bearer during the opening ceremony, and a volunteer carried the flag during the closing ceremony. He did not win a medal.

== Competitors ==
The nation was represented by two athletes.

Sport	Men	Women	Total
Alpine skiing	1	0	1
Figure skating	1	0	1
Total	2	0	2

== Alpine skiing ==
Uzbekistan qualified one male athlete. Tukhtaev made his debut at the Winter Olympics.

The Alpine skiing events were held at the Jeongseon Alpine Centre in Bukpyeong. The course for the events was designed by former Olympic champion Bernhard Russi. The weather was cold and windy during the events, and it was the coldest since the 1994 Winter Olympics at Lillehammer. Tukhtaev recorded his best finish in the men's giant slalom event, after he was ranked 52nd amongst the 109 competitors. He did not finish the men's slalom event.

Athlete	Event	Run 1		Run 2		Total	
Athlete	Event	Time	Rank	Time	Rank	Time	Rank
Komiljon Tukhtaev	Men's giant slalom	1:17.72	60	1:18.27	58	2:35.99	52
Komiljon Tukhtaev	Men's slalom	DNF					

== Figure skating ==
Uzbekistan qualified one male figure skater, based on its placement at the 2017 World Figure Skating Championships in Helsinki, Finland. This was the second Olympic participation for Misha Ge, after the 2014 Winter Olympics.

The figure skating competitions were held on 16 and 17 February 2018 at the Gangneung Ice Arena, Gangneung Olympic Park, Coastal Cluster, Gangneung. Misha Ge finished 14th in the short program amongst the 30 participants to advance to the freestyle round. In the freestyle round, he ended up in 17th place.

Athlete	Event	SP		FS		Total	
Athlete	Event	Points	Rank	Points	Rank	Points	Rank
Misha Ge	Men's singles	83.90	14 Q	161.04	17	244.94	17

== See also ==
- Uzbekistan at the 2017 Asian Winter Games
