= Svitlana Chernikova =

Ukrainian ice dancer

Personal information
- Native name: Світлана Іванівна Чернікова
- Full name: Svitlana Ivanivna Chernikova
- Other names: Svetlana Chernikova
- Born: 22 May 1977 (age 49) Prokhorovka, Belgorod Oblast, Russian SFSR
- Height: 1.67 m (5 ft 5 1/2 in)

Figure skating career
- Country: Ukraine
- Partner: Oleksandr Sosnenko
- Coach: Halyna Churilova

Svitlana Ivanivna Chernikova (Ukrainian: Світлана Іванівна Чернікова; born 22 May 1977) is a Ukrainian former competitive ice dancer. With Oleksandr Sosnenko, she won silver at the 1994 Prague Skate and at the 1994 Ukrainian Championships. The two competed at the 1994 Winter Olympics in Lillehammer, placing 19th. They were coached by Halyna Churilova.

== Competitive highlights ==
with Sosnenko

International
Event	1993–94	1994–95
Winter Olympics	19th	
European Championships	22nd	
Prague Skate		2nd
International de Paris / Trophée de France	9th	10th
National
Ukrainian Championships	2nd	
