= Azizjon Kamilov =

Uzbek sports administrator (born 1984)

Chairman at the Uzbekistan Judo Federation
- Incumbent
- Assumed office 20 December 2018
- Preceded by: Armen Bagdasarov

Vice President of National Olympic Committee of Uzbekistan
- Incumbent
- Assumed office 2019

Personal details
- Born: June 19, 1984 (age 42) Tashkent, Uzbek SSR, Soviet Union
- Education: Tashkent State Institute of Law (bachelor degree)

Azizjon Kamilov (uzb: Komilov Azizjon, ru: Камилов Азизжон Якубжанович, born June 19, 1984) - is an Uzbekistani sports administrator, in 2018 he has been selected as President of Uzbekistan Judo Federation and since 2019 Vice President of National Olympic Committee of Uzbekistan.

== Early life ==
Azizjon Kamilov was born in Tashkent, Uzbekistan on June 19, in 1984. Graduated from Tashkent State Institute of Law in 2004. A lawyer by profession. In 2018 he started sports executive career by selecting as the Chairman of Judo Federation of Uzbekistan.

== Career ==
- 2001-2007 – Tashkent State University of Law
- 2006-2007 - «ALM - feldmans» law office, lawyer
- 2008-2009 - АJ «KPMG» auditing company, Moscow office, leading specialist
- 2009-2013 - «Shanghai Epay Info Tech Co., Ltd», commercial director, member of the governing board
- 2014-2017 - «New Field Inc» CEO
- 2018 - until now - «Baikal» founder
- 2018 - until now - Chairman of the Judo Federation of Uzbekistan
- 2019 - until now - Vice President (Deputy Chairman) of the National Olympic Committee of the National Olympic Committee of Uzbekistan
