= Muslim Sattarov =

Uzbekistani ice dancer

Personal information
- Other names: Muslim Settarov
- Born: 12 November 1965 (age 60) Tashkent, Uzbek SSR, Soviet Union
- Height: 1.71 m (5 ft 7 1/2 in)

Figure skating career
- Country: Uzbekistan
- Partner: Dinara Nurdbayeva

Muslim Sattarov (born 12 November 1965) is an Uzbekistani former competitive ice dancer. With his skating partner, Dinara Nurdbayeva, he represented Uzbekistan at the 1994 Winter Olympics in Lillehammer, placing 21st in the ice dance category.

== Competitive highlights ==
with Nurdbayeva

International
Event	1994
Winter Olympics	21st
World Championships	33rd
