= Oleg Shamaev =

Uzbekistani alpine skier (born 1982)

Oleg Shamaev (born August 2, 1982 in Chirchik) is an alpine skier from Uzbekistan. He competed for Uzbekistan at the 2010 Winter Olympics in the slalom and giant slalom. Shamaev was Uzbekistan's flag bearer during the 2010 Winter Olympics opening ceremony.
