= Uzbekistan Bodybuilding and Fitness Federation =

Sports governing body in Uzbekistan

Uzbekistan Bodybuilding and Fitness Federation UzFBF
- Sport: Bodybuilding
- Official website: uzfbf.com

History
- Year of formation: 2006

Demographics
- Number of Bodybuilding clubs: PROFORM FITNESS

Elected
- President: Odil Abdurakhmanov
- Chair: Timur Sabirov

Secretariat
- Country: Uzbekistan
- Secretary General: Farkhod Matkarimov

Finance
- Sponsors: Proform Fitness, 7Saber, ZiyoForum, Generation Iron Central Asia

Uzbekistan Bodybuilding and Fitness Federation (uzb. O`zbekiston Bodibilding va fitness federatsiyasi, ru:Федерация бодибилдинга и фитнеса Узекистана) is the governing body of amateur and professional bodybuilding in Uzbekistan. It was officially founded and registered in 2006 by Timur Sabirov, Odil Abdurakhmonov and Dmitriy Adisman. Uzbekistan Bodybuilding and Fitness Federation is officially recognised by National Olympic Committee of Uzbekistan. The headquarters is located in Tashkent. The Federation is member of Asian Bodybuilding and Physique Sports Federation (AFBB) and World Bodybuilding & Physique Federation (WBPF). The Federation is responsible for the promotion and growth of the game of bodybuilding in Uzbekistan

== History ==
The history of UZFBF (Bodybuilding and Fitness Federation of Uzbekistan) dates back to the 80s. It was at that time that athletics and gymnastics experienced a wave of interest in Tashkent, but official organizations were not in a hurry to support it. But thanks to two athletes - N. Belavin and E. Bublik, the first sports club was established for those who wanted to do athletics. This event gave a strong impetus to the development of this sport, and soon, in 1988, our compatriot Yuri Dementyev became the winner of the first USSR bodybuilding championship! In 1989, the first Open Championship was held in Tashkent. After the collapse of the USSR, Daniil Plakida founded the Bodybuilding Federation of the Republic of Uzbekistan, after which competitions "Mr. and Mrs. Tashkent", "Mr. and Mrs. Uzbekistan" and other championships of the Republic began to be held. In 2006, in honor of the founders of the federation - Odil Abdurahmanov, Dmitry Adisman and Timur Sobirov, it received the name of the current UZFBF.⠀ Since 2012, UZFBF became a member of federations such as ABBF and WBPF, which brought it to the level of international competitions.

== Governance ==
• President of UzFBF - Odil Abdurakhmonov

• Vice President of UzFBF - Dmitry Adisman

• Vice President of UzFBF - Timur Sabirov

• General Secretary - Farkhod Matkarimov

• Head of information department - Daniil Plakida

• President of department IFBB - Khabibulla Nizamov

== Notable bodybuilders ==
Pavel Umurzakov is absolute champion of Uzbekistan in 2014, 2016 and absolute champion of Central Asia in 2017, 2 x Champion of Asia (ABBF-WBPF) in 2015, 2018 and 4 x World Bodybuilding and Fitness Champion (WBPF) in 2021, 2019, 2018, 2016 years. Umurzakovs is the first World Champion in bodybuilding in the history of Uzbekistan.

Mikhail Volinkin is the only bodybuilder who took the first ever winning athlete from Central Asia to receive an IFBB pro card. He is the winner of Arnold Classics 2018 in Overall men's category. He competed as IFBB pro at Arnold Classic Pro in 2019.

== Affiliation ==
International Federation of BodyBuilding and Fitness

World Bodybuilding Federation

Mr. Olympia Mr. Universe

List of IFBB member federations
