= Odil Abdurakhmanov =

Uzbekistani politician

Odil Abdurakhmanov Odil Abdurahmonov Одил Абдурахманов
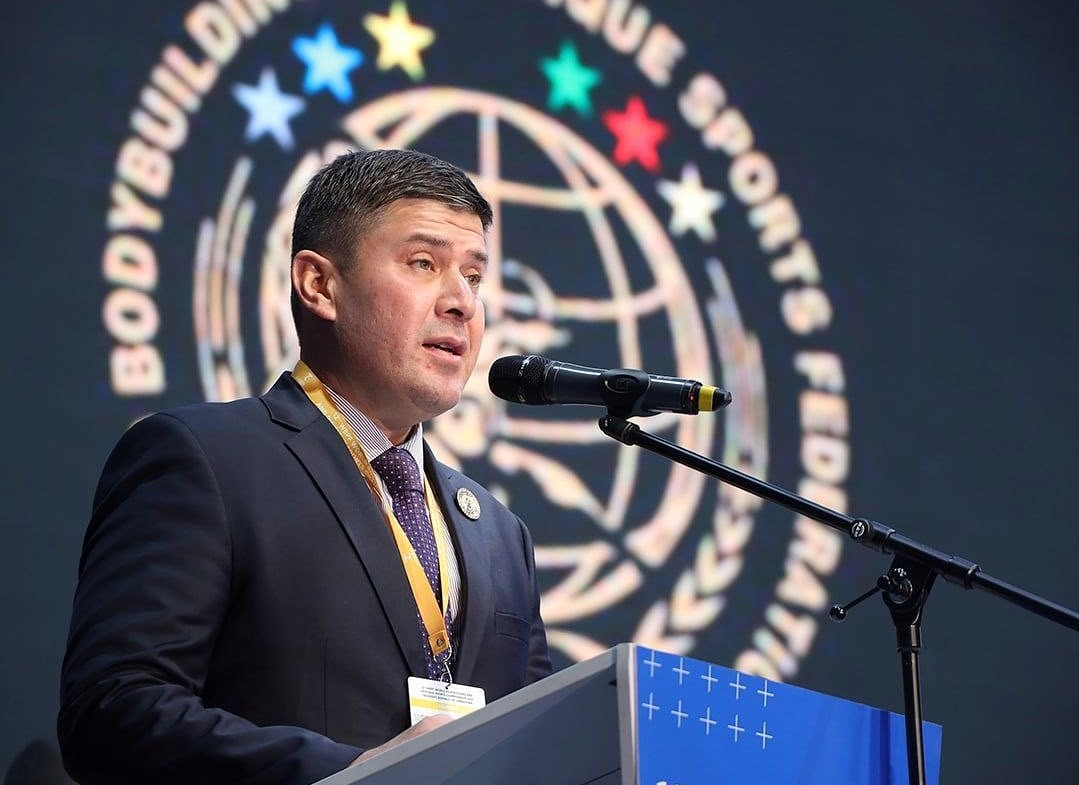

Head of the Department of Social Development of the Administration of the President of the Republic of Uzbekistan
- In office August 25, 2022 – July 2020
- President: Shavkat Mirziyoyev
- Preceded by: Abdujabbor Abduvokhidov

Deputy Advisor to the President for the Development of Science, Education, Health and Sports

President of Uzbekistan Bodybuilding and Fitness Federation

Deputy minister of higher and secondary specialized education
- In office July 31, 2018 – 2019

Rector of Tashkent State Transport University
- Incumbent
- Assumed office June 20, 2020

Personal details
- Born: 6 February 1978 (age 48)
- Education: Tashkent State University of Economics Bachelor and Master Doctor of Economics

Odil Abdurakhmanov (uzb. Odil Abdurohmonov, Cyrillic: Одил Каландарович Абдурахманов, born 6 February 1978) is a representative of the President of the Republic of Uzbekistan on the issues of sport. At the same time he is the President of Bodybuilding and Fitness Federation of Uzbekistan. Previously, Odil Abdurakhmanov was an adviser to the President on youth politics, science, education, health, culture and sports issues.

== Career ==
Politics

- 2023 - Head of the Department of Social Development of the Administration of the President of the Republic of Uzbekistan
- 2020- Rector of Tashkent State Transport University
- 2022-2023 - Adviser to the President on youth politics, science, education, health, culture and sports issues.
- 2018-2019 - Deputy minister of higher and secondary specialized education.
- Chief consultant in the Presidential Administration of Uzbekistan
- 2019 - Deputy Advisor to the President for the Development of Science, Education, Health and Sports
- 2011- Head of the Republican Scientific Center for Employment, Labor Protection and Social Protection of the Population.

Sports

- 2006 - Founder of Bodybuilding and Fitness Federation of Uzbekistan
- 2019 - President of Bodybuilding and Fitness Federation of Uzbekistan

== Personal life ==
Odil Abdurakhmanov is married
