= Timur Sabirov =

Uzbekistani sports administrator

Timur Sabirov Тимур Сабиров
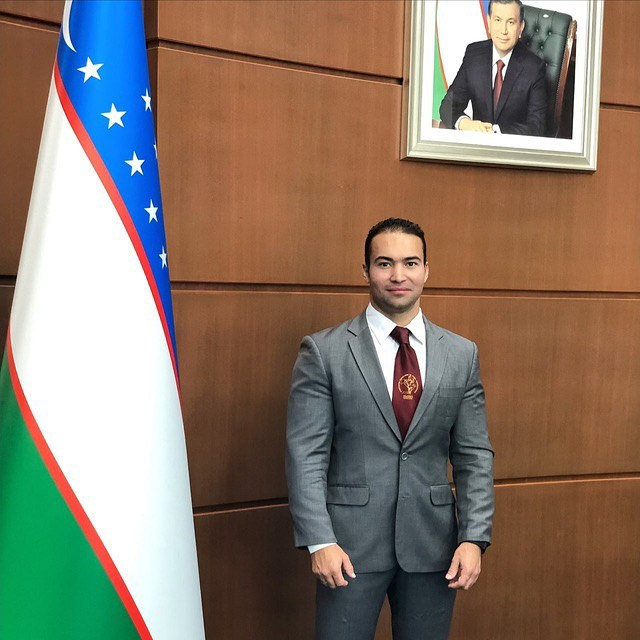

Personal information
- Citizenship: Uzbekistan
- Born: January 23, 1986 (age 40) Tashkent, Uzbekistan
- Education: Uzbek State University of Physical Culture and Sport
- Occupation(s): Bodybuilder, Athlete
- Employer: Vice President of UzFBF
- Website: www.uzfbf.com

Sport
- Sport: Bodybuilding
- Club: PROFORM
- Retired: 2012

Timur Sabirov (uzb. Timur Sobirov, ru: Тимур Сабиров born January 1, in 1986) - is a Vice President of Bodybuilding and Fitness Federation of Uzbekistan, Executive Council Members And Patrons of ABBF (Asian Bodybuilding And Physique Sports Federation) and a former professional bodybuilder.

== Biography ==
Timur Sabirov was born in Tashkent, Uzbekistan. He started his bodybuilding career in early 2000. He is an absolute champion of Uzbekistan in 2007 and 2008 in bodybuilding, a winner of the open championship of Kazakhstan in 2008. After ending his professional career in bodybuilding he has been selected as a Vice President of Bodybuilding and Fitness Federation of Uzbekistan

== Sports career ==
Timur Sabirov in Bodybuilding Competitions
Year	Competition	Result
2007	Uzbekistan Open Championship	1st
2008	Uzbekistan Open Championship	1st
2008	Central Asia and Kazakhstan Championship	3rd

After ending professional career in bodybuilding he has been selected as Vice President of Bodybuiling and Fitness Federation of Uzbekistan. He started organaizing of major sporting events, including World Cup Power Extreme 2011 and 2012, bodybuilding show-tournament “Night of Champions – 2011, 49th Asian Bodybuilding and Physique Championships, 12th World Bodybuilding and Physique Sports Championships and many other national tournaments.

Year	Competition
2021	12th World Bodybuilding and Physique Sports Championships
2015	49th Asian Bodybuilding and Physique Championships
2014	Night of Champions
2013	Night of Champions
2012	PROFORM Classis - Sports Festival
2011	Night of Champions
2012	World Cup Power Extreme
2011	World Cup Power Extreme

== Personal life ==
Sabirov is married and he has 3 daughters.

== See also ==
Uzbekistan Bodybuilding and Fitness Federation
