= Sergey Brener =

Uzbekistani freestyle skier (born 1971)

Personal information
- Nationality: Uzbekistani
- Born: 6 March 1971 (age 55)

Sport
- Sport: Freestyle skiing

Sergey Brener (born 6 March 1971) is an Uzbekistani freestyle skier. He competed in the men's aerials event at the 1994 Winter Olympics.
