= Kseniya Grigoreva =

Uzbekistani alpine skier (born 1987)

Kseniya Grigoreva (born 25 November 1987) is an alpine skier from Uzbekistan. She competed for Uzbekistan at the 2010 Winter Olympics. Her best result was a 58th place in the giant slalom.
