= Kayrat Ermetov =

Uzbekistani alpine skier (born 1984)

Personal information
- Nationality: Uzbekistani
- Born: 23 May 1984 (age 41); Bustanlik, Soviet Union

Sport
- Sport: Alpine skiing

Kayrat Ermetov (born 23 May 1984) is an Uzbekistani alpine skier. He competed in the men's slalom at the 2006 Winter Olympics.
