= Kamil Urumbaev =

Uzbekistani alpine skier (born 1976)

Personal information
- Nationality: Uzbekistani
- Born: 7 September 1976 (age 48); Bustanlik, Soviet Union

Sport
- Sport: Alpine skiing

Kamil Urumbaev (born 7 September 1976) is an Uzbekistani alpine skier. He competed at the 1998 Winter Olympics and the 2002 Winter Olympics.
