= Komiljon Tukhtaev =

Uzbekistani alpine skier (born 1997)

Kamiljon Tukhtaev
Personal information
- Born: 30 October 1997 (age 28) Yangiabad, Uzbekistan

Skiing career
- Sport: Alpine skiing
- Club: Yangiabad Alpine Skiing Community

Kamiljon Tukhtaev (born October 30, 1997) is an Uzbekistani alpine ski racer.

== Career ==
Tukhtaev competed at the 2015 World Championships in Beaver Creek, USA, in the giant slalom. Tukhtaev did not complete the race.

Tukhtaev was the only alpine skier to compete for Uzbekistan at the 2018 Winter Olympics in Pyeongchang, South Korea, where he competed in giant slalom.
