= National Olympic Committee of the Republic of Uzbekistan =

National Olympic Committee

- Country/Region: Uzbekistan
- Code: UZB
- Created: 1992
- Recognized: 1993
- Continental Association: OCA
- Headquarters: Tashkent, Uzbekistan
- President: Shavkat Mirziyoyev
- Secretary General: Oybek Kasimov
- Website: www.olympic.uz

Old logo

The National Olympic Committee of the Republic of Uzbekistan (Latinised-Uzbek: Oʻzbekiston Milliy Olimpiya qoʻmitasi) is the National Olympic Committee representing Uzbekistan. It was founded in the year of 1992, although it was not recognised by the International Olympic Committee until 1 January 1993. The headquarters of the committee is in the capital city of Tashkent. The incumbent president of the national committee is Rustam Shoabdurahmonov.

== Sports federations ==
Boxing Federation of Uzbekistan

Chairman: Achilbay Dzhumaniyazovich Ramatov

First Deputy Chairman: Saken Dzhetibayevich Polatov

General Secretary: Shohid Tillaboev

Date of foundation: 1992

The Judo Federation of Uzbekistan

Chairman: Kamilov Azizjon Yakubdzhanovich

General Secretary: Jamshid Nasritddinov

Date of foundation: 1991

Wrestling Association of Uzbekistan

Chairman: Salim Kirgizbaevich Abduvaliev

General Secretary: Mamadaliyev Shukhrat Farkhadovich

Vice-chairmen: Shofaiziev Shomurod Mukhsinovich

Date of foundation: 1998.

Taekwondo Association (WTF) of Uzbekistan

Chairman: Sherzod Tashmatov

General Secretary: Isroilov Abduzaim

Tennis Federation of Uzbekistan

Chairman: Mirsoatov Alisher Kudratullaevich

General Secretary: Tulyaganova Iroda Batyrovna

Date of foundation: 1999

Weightlifting Federation of Uzbekistan

Chairman: Zakirov Botir Irkinovich

General Secretary: Abdukarimov Bakhtiyar Abdurakhimovich

First Deputy Chairman: Shakhrullo Sharipovich Makhmudov

Date of foundation: 2001

Fencing Federation of Uzbekistan

Chairman: Abdusamatov Maqsud Abduvaliyevich

General Secretary: Gulnara Tulkunovna Saidova

Date of foundation: 1992

Football Association of Uzbekistan

Chairman: Azizov Abdusalom Abdumavlonovich

General Secretary: Avaz Parkhatovich Maksumov

First Deputy Chairman: Irmatov Ravshan Saifutdinovich

Date of foundation: 1992

Federation of Horse Breeding and Equestrian Sports of Uzbekistan

Chairman: Bakhromjon Gaziev

General Secretary: Ibragimov Nodirbek Anvarbekovich

Date of foundation: 1997

Uzbekistan Athletics Federation

Chairman: Abdullayev Mekhriddin Razzakovich

Deputy chairman: Andrey Khakimovich Abduvaliev

General Secretary: Komoliddin Fakhriddinovich Ruzamukhamedov

Date of foundation: 1992

Uzbekistan Volleyball Federation

Chairman: Toshqulov Abduqodir Hamidovich

General Secretary: Nasrullaev Husan

Date of foundation: 1991

Uzbekistan Handball Federation

Chairman: Amonjon Mukhammatyaminovich Musayev

General Secretary: Matkhalikov Ismail Ikramovich

Date of foundation: 1992

Uzbekistan Table Tennis Federation

Chairman: Kudbiyev Sherzod Davlyatovich

General Secretary: Acting Baymukhamedov Oybek Shukhratovich

Date of foundation: 1993

Field Hockey Federation of Uzbekistan

Chairman: Akhmedov Bahodir Mazhidovich

General Secretary: Yuldashev Sunnatilla Turabovich

Date of foundation: 1994

Rowing & Canoe Federation of Uzbekistan

Chairman: Sultanov Alisher Saidabbasovich

General Secretary: Vyacheslav S. Diedrich

Date of foundation: 1992

Uzbekistan Rugby Federation

Chairman: Safayev Sadyk Salikhovich

General Secretary: Dzhalilov Kakhramon Khakimovich

Date of foundation: 2001

Water Sports Federation of Uzbekistan

Chairman: Kuvandyk Sanakulovich Sanakulov

Secretary General: Ganiev Alisher Abdumazhitovich

First Deputy Chairman: Gulyamov Saidakhrol Ganievich

Date of foundation: 1992

Cycling Federation of Uzbekistan

Chairman: Tanzila Kamalovna Narbaeva

General Secretary: Kazim Bakhtierovich Urinbaykhodzhaev

Date of foundation: 1991

Archery Federation of Uzbekistan

Chairman: Djurayev Rustam Mirzayevich

Vice-president: Imamov Otabek Sabitdzhanovich

Date of foundation: 2005

Shooting Sports Federation of Uzbekistan

Chairman: Oybek Kabildzhanovich Norinboev

General Secretary: Davranov Mardonbek Farhadovich

Date of foundation: 1998

Triathlon Federation of Uzbekistan

Chairman: Makhmudov Viktor Vladimirovich

Deputy Chairman: Nasyrov Farrukh

General Secretary: Kun Elena

Date of foundation: May 3, 2019

Basketbol Federation of Uzbekistan

Chairman: Davletov Ruslanbek Kuroltoevich

General Secretary: Ravshan Muminjanovich Ganiev

Date of foundation: 1992.

Modern Penthathlon Federation of Uzbekistan

Chairman: Bakhromjon Gaziev

General Secretary: Ksenia Sergeevna Gulyamova

Date of foundation: 2017

Association of Winter Sports of Uzbekistan

Chairman: Iskander Kasimovich Shadiev

General Secretary: Asatullaev Sherzod Khasankhodzhayevich V. V. B.

Date of foundation: 2011

Uzbekistan Federation of Bodybuilding and Fitness

Chairman: Abdurakhmanov Odil Qalandarovich

Vice President: Timur Sabirov

General Secretary: Farhad Matkarimov

Date of foundation: 2005

== See also ==
- O'zbekiston Milliy Olimpiya qo'mitasi
